This is an incomplete list of Acts of the Parliament of Great Britain for the years 1795–1800. For Acts passed up until 1707 see List of Acts of the Parliament of England and List of Acts of the Parliament of Scotland. See also the List of Acts of the Parliament of Ireland to 1700 and the List of Acts of the Parliament of Ireland, 1701–1800.

For Acts passed from 1801 onwards see List of Acts of the Parliament of the United Kingdom. For Acts of the devolved parliaments and assemblies in the United Kingdom, see the List of Acts of the Scottish Parliament, the List of Acts of the Northern Ireland Assembly, and the List of Acts and Measures of the National Assembly for Wales; see also the List of Acts of the Parliament of Northern Ireland.

The number shown after each Act's title is its chapter number. Acts are cited using this number, preceded by the year(s) of the reign during which the relevant parliamentary session was held; thus the Union with Ireland Act 1800 is cited as "39 & 40 Geo 3 c 67", meaning the 67th Act passed during the session that started in the 39th year of the reign of George III and which finished in the 40th year of that reign. Note that the modern convention is to use Arabic numerals in citations (thus "41 Geo 3" rather than "41 Geo III"). Acts of the last session of the Parliament of Great Britain and the first session of the Parliament of the United Kingdom are both cited as "41 Geo 3".

Acts passed by the Parliament of Great Britain did not have a short title; however, some of these Acts have subsequently been given a short title by Acts of the Parliament of the United Kingdom (such as the Short Titles Act 1896).

From the session 38 Geo 3 onwards, "Public Acts" were separated into "Public General Acts" and "Public Local and Personal Acts".

1795

35 Geo. 3

Public acts

| {{|Land Tax Act 1795|public|2|30-12-1794|note3=|repealed=y|archived=n|}}

| {{|Habeas Corpus Suspension Act 1795|public|3|30-12-1794|note3=|repealed=y|archived=n|}}

| {{|Exportation and Importation Act 1795|public|4|30-12-1794|note3=|repealed=y|archived=n|}}

| {{|Manning of the Navy Act 1795|public|5|30-12-1794|note3=|repealed=y|archived=n|}}

| {{|Mutiny Act 1795|public|6|30-12-1794|note3=|repealed=y|archived=n|}}

| {{|Marine Mutiny Act 1795|public|7|30-12-1794|note3=|repealed=y|archived=n|}}

| {{|Grand Junction Canal (No. 1) Act 1795|note1=|public|8|30-12-1794|note3=|repealed=y|archived=n|}}

| {{|Manning of the Navy Act 1795|public|9|30-12-1794|note3=|repealed=y|archived=n|}}

| {{|Excise Act 1795|public|10|30-12-1794|note3=|repealed=y|archived=n|}}

| {{|Excise Act 1795|public|11|30-12-1794|note3=|repealed=y|archived=n|}}

| {{|Excise Act 1795|public|12|30-12-1794|note3=|repealed=y|archived=n|}}

| {{|Excise Act 1795|public|13|30-12-1794|note3=|repealed=y|archived=n|}}

| {{|National Debt Act 1795|public|14|30-12-1794|note3=|repealed=y|archived=n|}}

| {{|Importation Act 1795|public|15|30-12-1794|note3=|repealed=y|archived=n|}}

| {{|Militia, Derbyshire Act 1795|public|16|30-12-1794|note3=|repealed=y|archived=n|}}

| {{|Land Tax Act 1795|public|17|30-12-1794|note3=|repealed=y|archived=n|}}

| {{|Criminal Court, Norfolk Island Act 1795|public|18|30-12-1794|note3=|repealed=y|archived=n|}}

| {{|Manning of the Navy Act 1795|public|19|30-12-1794|note3=|repealed=y|archived=n|}}

| {{|Customs Act 1795|public|20|30-12-1794|note3=|repealed=y|archived=n|}}

| {{|Loans or Exchequer Bills Act 1795|public|21|30-12-1794|note3=|repealed=y|archived=n|}}

| {{|Loans or Exchequer Bills Act 1795|public|22|30-12-1794|note3=|repealed=y|archived=n|}}

| {{|National Debt Act 1795|public|23|30-12-1794|note3=|repealed=y|archived=n|}}

| {{|Aliens Act 1795|public|24|30-12-1794|note3=|repealed=y|archived=n|}}

| {{|Courts, Newfoundland Act 1795|public|25|30-12-1794|note3=|repealed=y|archived=n|}}

| {{|Trade with America Act 1795|public|26|30-12-1794|note3=|repealed=y|archived=n|}}

| {{|London Militia Act 1795|public|27|30-12-1794|note3=|repealed=y|archived=n|}}

| {{|Navy and Marines Act 1795|public|28|30-12-1794|note3=|repealed=y|archived=n|}}

| {{|Manning of the Navy Act 1795|public|29|30-12-1794|note3=|repealed=y|archived=n|}}

| {{|Stamps Act 1795|public|30|30-12-1794|note3=|repealed=y|archived=n|}}

| {{|Smuggling, etc. Act 1795|public|31|30-12-1794|note3=|repealed=y|archived=n|}}

| {{|National Debt Act 1795|public|32|30-12-1794|note3=|repealed=y|archived=n|}}

| {{|Militia Pay Act 1795|public|33|30-12-1794|note3=|repealed=y|archived=n|}}

| {{|Manning of the Navy Act 1795|public|34|30-12-1794|note3=|repealed=y|archived=n|}}

| {{|Militia Allowance Act 1795|public|35|30-12-1794|note3=|repealed=y|archived=n|}}

| {{|Lottery Act 1795|public|36|30-12-1794|note3=|repealed=y|archived=n|}}

| {{|Loans or Exchequer Bills Act 1795|public|37|30-12-1794|note3=|repealed=y|archived=n|}}

| {{|Continuance of Laws Act 1795|public|38|30-12-1794|note3=|repealed=y|archived=n|}}

| {{|Drawback of Duties Act 1795|public|39|30-12-1794|note3=|repealed=y|archived=n|}}

| {{|Crown Lands in Northamptonshire, Grant to Earl of Upper Ossory Act 1795|public|40|30-12-1794|note3=|repealed=y|archived=n|}}

| {{|Aberdeen Harbour Act 1795|public|41|30-12-1794|note3=|repealed=y|archived=n|}}

| {{|Montrose Beer Duties Act 1795|public|42|30-12-1794|note3=|repealed=y|archived=n|}}

| {{|Grand Junction Canal (No. 2) Act 1795|note1=|public|43|30-12-1794|note3=|repealed=y|archived=n|}}

| {{|Bridgwater Canal Act 1795|public|44|30-12-1794|note3=|repealed=y|archived=n|}}

| {{|Finsbury Square (Paving, Watching, etc.) Act 1795|public|45|30-12-1794|note3=|repealed=y|archived=n|}}

| {{|Hull: Improvement Act 1795|public|46|30-12-1794|note3=|repealed=y|archived=n|}}

| {{|Haydon, Chapel, Northumberland Act 1795|public|47|30-12-1794|note3=|repealed=y|archived=n|}}

| {{|Isle of Ely: Drainage Act 1795|public|48|30-12-1794|note3=|repealed=y|archived=n|}}

| {{|Duty on Hair Powder Act 1795|public|49|30-12-1794|note3=|repealed=y|archived=n|}}

| {{|Indemnity Act 1795|public|50|30-12-1794|note3=|repealed=y|archived=n|}}

| {{|Southampton to New Sarum Canal Act 1795|public|51|30-12-1794|note3=|repealed=y|archived=n|}}

| {{|Abingdon to Trowbridge Canal Act 1795|public|52|30-12-1794|note3=|repealed=y|archived=n|}}

| {{|Postage Act 1795|public|53|30-12-1794|note3=|repealed=y|archived=n|}}

| {{|Mackerel Fishery Act 1795|public|54|30-12-1794|note3=|repealed=y|archived=n|}}

| {{|Stamps Act 1795|public|55|30-12-1794|note3=|repealed=y|archived=n|}}

| {{|British Fisheries Act 1795|public|56|30-12-1794|note3=|repealed=y|archived=n|}}

| {{|Indemnity to Certain Governors, etc. Act 1795|public|57|30-12-1794|note3=|repealed=y|archived=n|}}

| {{|Registry of Boats, etc. Act 1795|public|58|30-12-1794|note3=|repealed=y|archived=n|}}

| {{|Duties on Scotch Distilleries Act 1795|public|59|30-12-1794|note3=|repealed=y|archived=n|}}

| {{|Militia, Staffordshire Act 1795|public|60|30-12-1794|note3=|repealed=y|archived=n|}}

| {{|Bishopsgate: Poor Relief Act 1795|public|61|30-12-1794|note3=|repealed=y|archived=n|}}

| {{|Post Office Act 1795|public|62|30-12-1794|note3=|repealed=y|archived=n|}}

| {{|Stamps Act 1795|public|63|30-12-1794|note3=|repealed=y|archived=n|}}

| {{|Quartering of Soldiers Act 1795|public|64|30-12-1794|note3=|repealed=y|archived=n|}}

| {{|Parliamentary Elections Act 1795|public|65|30-12-1794|note3=|repealed=y|archived=n|}}

| {{|National Debt Act 1795|public|66|30-12-1794|note3=|repealed=y|archived=n|}}

| {{|Bigamy Act 1795|public|67|30-12-1794|note3=|repealed=y|archived=n|}}

| {{|Conway's Patent Kiln Act 1795|public|68|30-12-1794|note3=|repealed=y|archived=n|}}

| {{|Crown Lands – Forfeited Estates Act 1795|public|69|30-12-1794|note3=|repealed=y|archived=n|}}

| {{|Saint John's Church, Hackney Act 1795|public|70|30-12-1794|note3=|repealed=y|archived=n|}}

| {{|Halifax Church Act 1795|public|71|30-12-1794|note3=|repealed=y|archived=n|}}

| {{|Lapworth to Kingswood Canal Act 1795|public|72|30-12-1794|note3=|repealed=y|archived=n|}}

| {{|Saint Marylebone: Improvement Act 1795|public|73|30-12-1794|note3=|repealed=y|archived=n|}}

| {{|Kensington: Improvement Act 1795|public|74|30-12-1794|note3=|repealed=y|archived=n|}}

| {{|Wallingford: Improvement Act 1795|public|75|30-12-1794|note3=|repealed=y|archived=n|}}

| {{|Aberdeen Improvements Act 1795|public|76|30-12-1794|note3=|repealed=y|archived=n|}}

| {{|River Ouse: Navigation Act 1795|public|77|30-12-1794|note3=|repealed=y|archived=n|}}

| {{|Bewdley Bridge Act 1795|public|78|30-12-1794|note3=|repealed=y|archived=n|}}

| {{|Henley Improvement Act 1795|public|79|30-12-1794|note3=|repealed=y|archived=n|}}

| {{|Shipping Act 1795|public|80|30-12-1794|note3=|repealed=y|archived=n|}}

| {{|Families of Militiamen Act 1795|public|81|30-12-1794|note3=|repealed=y|archived=n|}}

| {{|Gainsborough Inclosure, etc. Act 1795|public|82|30-12-1794|note3=|repealed=y|archived=n|}}

| {{|Artillery Corps, etc. Act 1795|public|83|30-12-1794|note3=|repealed=y|archived=n|}}

| {{|Thames: Ballastage Act 1795|public|84|30-12-1794|note3=|repealed=y|archived=n|}}

| {{|Grand Junction Canal (No. 3) Act 1795|note1=|public|85|30-12-1794|note3=|repealed=y|archived=n|}}

| {{|River Itchin: Navigation Act 1795|public|86|30-12-1794|note3=|repealed=y|archived=n|}}

| {{|Stoke to Newcastle Canal Act 1795|public|87|30-12-1794|note3=|repealed=y|archived=n|}}

| {{|Insolvent Debtor's Discharge Act 1795|public|88|30-12-1794|note3=|repealed=y|archived=n|}}

| {{|Duties on Spirits Act 1795|public|89|30-12-1794|note3=|repealed=y|archived=n|}}

| {{|Slave Trade Act 1795|public|90|30-12-1794|note3=|repealed=y|archived=n|}}

| {{|Hawkers and Pedlars Act 1795|public|91|30-12-1794|note3=|repealed=y|archived=n|}}

| {{|Southern Whale Fisheries Act 1795|public|92|30-12-1794|note3=|repealed=y|archived=n|}}

| {{|Loan to Emperor of Germany Act 1795|public|93|30-12-1794|note3=|repealed=y|archived=n|}}

| {{|Navy Pay Act 1795|public|94|30-12-1794|note3=|repealed=y|archived=n|}}

| {{|Navy Pay Act 1795|public|95|30-12-1794|note3=|repealed=y|archived=n|}}

| {{|Relief of Revenue Prisoners Act 1795|public|96|30-12-1794|note3=|repealed=y|archived=n|}}

| {{|Excise Act 1795|public|97|30-12-1794|note3=|repealed=y|archived=n|}}

| {{|Drawback Act 1795|public|98|30-12-1794|note3=|repealed=y|archived=n|}}

| {{|Papists Act 1795|public|99|30-12-1794|note3=|repealed=y|archived=n|}}

| {{|Importation Act 1795|public|100|30-12-1794|note3=|repealed=y|archived=n|}}

| {{|Poor Removal Act 1795|public|101|30-12-1794|note3=|repealed=y|archived=n|}}

| {{|Weights and Measures Act 1795|public|102|30-12-1794|note3=|repealed=y|archived=n|}}

| {{|Painshill Estate Act 1795|public|103|30-12-1794|note3=|repealed=y|archived=n|}}

| {{|Estate of Benjamin Hopkins Act 1795|public|103|30-12-1794|note3=|repealed=y|archived=n|}}

| {{|London and Hertford Hospitals Act 1795|public|104|30-12-1794|note3=|repealed=y|archived=n|}}

| {{|River Ivel: Navigation Act 1795|public|105|30-12-1794|note3=|repealed=y|archived=n|}}

| {{|Rivers Thames and Isis: Navigation Act 1795|public|106|30-12-1794|note3=|repealed=y|archived=n|}}

| {{|Isle of Axholme: Inclosure, etc. Act 1795|public|107|30-12-1794|note3=|repealed=y|archived=n|}}

| {{|Redstone Bridge, Severn Act 1795|public|108|30-12-1794|note3=|repealed=y|archived=n|}}

| {{|Carriage Duties Act 1795|public|109|30-12-1794|note3=|repealed=y|archived=n|}}

| {{|Drawback Act 1795|public|110|30-12-1794|note3=|repealed=y|archived=n|}}

| {{|Friendly Societies Act 1795|public|111|30-12-1794|note3=|repealed=y|archived=n|}}

| {{|Hair Powder Certificates, etc. Act 1795|public|112|30-12-1794|note3=|repealed=y|archived=n|}}

| {{|Sale of Beer Act 1795|note1=|public|113|30-12-1794|note3=|repealed=y|archived=n|}}

| {{|Duties on Glass Act 1795|public|114|30-12-1794|note3=|repealed=y|archived=n|}}

| {{|Importation Act 1795|public|115|30-12-1794|note3=|repealed=y|archived=n|}}

| {{|Excise Act 1795|public|116|30-12-1794|note3=|repealed=y|archived=n|}}

| {{|Importation Act 1795|public|117|30-12-1794|note3=|repealed=y|archived=n|}}

| {{|Warehousing of Wines, etc. Act 1795|public|118|30-12-1794|note3=|repealed=y|archived=n|}}

| {{|Making of Spirits from Wheat, etc. Act 1795|public|119|30-12-1794|note3=|repealed=y|archived=n|}}

| {{|Appropriation Act 1795|public|120|30-12-1794|note3=|repealed=y|archived=n|}}

| {{|Manning of the Navy Act 1795|public|121|30-12-1794|note3=|repealed=y|archived=n|}}

| {{|Burghs of Barony (Scotland) Act 1795|note1=|public|122|30-12-1794|note3=|repealed=y|archived=n|}}

| {{|Small Debts (Scotland) Act 1795|public|123|30-12-1794|note3=|repealed=y|archived=n|}}

| {{|Woolcombers Act 1795|public|124|30-12-1794|note3=|repealed=y|archived=n|}}

| {{|Heir Apparent's Establishment Act 1795|note1=|public|125|30-12-1794|note3=|repealed=y|archived=n|}}

| {{|Temple Bar, etc. Act 1795|public|126|30-12-1794|note3=|repealed=y|archived=n|}}

| {{|Relief of Traders of Grenada, etc. Act 1795|public|127|30-12-1794|note3=|repealed=y|archived=n|}}

| {{|National Debt Act 1795|public|128|30-12-1794|note3=|repealed=y|archived=n|}}

| {{|Prince of Wales Act 1795|public|129|30-12-1794|note3=|repealed=y|archived=n|}}

| {{|Princess of Wales Act 1795|public|130|30-12-1794|note3=|repealed=y|archived=n|}}

| {{|Blackfriars Sewer Act 1795|public|131|30-12-1794|note3=|repealed=y|archived=n|}}

| {{|Yarmouth to Gorleston Road Act 1795|public|132|30-12-1794|note3=|repealed=y|archived=n|}}

| {{|Worcester Roads Act 1795|public|133|30-12-1794|note3=|repealed=y|archived=n|}}

| {{|Middlesex Roads Act 1795|public|134|30-12-1794|note3=|repealed=y|archived=n|}}

| {{|Keighley to Bradford Road Act 1795|public|135|30-12-1794|note3=|repealed=y|archived=n|}}

| {{|Wiltshire Roads Act 1795|public|136|30-12-1794|note3=|repealed=y|archived=n|}}

| {{|Oldham and Saddleworth Roads Act 1795|public|137|30-12-1794|note3=|repealed=y|archived=n|}}

| {{|Preston Candover to Alton Road Act 1795|public|138|30-12-1794|note3=|repealed=y|archived=n|}}

| {{|Durham Roads Act 1795|public|139|30-12-1794|note3=|repealed=y|archived=n|}}

| {{|Gloucester Roads Act 1795|public|140|30-12-1794|note3=|repealed=y|archived=n|}}

| {{|Cirencester to Birdlip Hill Road Act 1795|public|141|30-12-1794|note3=|repealed=y|archived=n|}}

| {{|Kensington Road Act 1795|public|142|30-12-1794|note3=|repealed=y|archived=n|}}

| {{|Carmarthen Roads Act 1795|public|143|30-12-1794|note3=|repealed=y|archived=n|}}

| {{|Lancaster Roads Act 1795|public|144|30-12-1794|note3=|repealed=y|archived=n|}}

| {{|Wigan to Preston Road Act 1795|public|145|30-12-1794|note3=|repealed=y|archived=n|}}

| {{|Burnley Roads Act 1795|public|146|30-12-1794|note3=|repealed=y|archived=n|}}

| {{|Islington: Poor Relief etc Act 1795|public|147|30-12-1794|note3=|repealed=y|archived=n|}}

| {{|Bedford to Kimbolton Road Act 1795|public|148|30-12-1794|note3=|repealed=y|archived=n|}}

| {{|Aylesbury to West Wycombe Road Act 1795|public|149|30-12-1794|note3=|repealed=y|archived=n|}}

| {{|Edinburgh etc. Roads Act 1795|public|150|30-12-1794|note3=|repealed=y|archived=n|}}

| {{|Keighley to Halifax Road Act 1795|public|151|30-12-1794|note3=|repealed=y|archived=n|}}

| {{|Stamford to Greetham Road Act 1795|public|152|30-12-1794|note3=|repealed=y|archived=n|}}

| {{|Towcester to Hardington Road Act 1795|public|153|30-12-1794|note3=|repealed=y|archived=n|}}

| {{|Derby Roads Act 1795|public|154|30-12-1794|note3=|repealed=y|archived=n|}}

| {{|Glasgow Roads Act 1795|public|155|30-12-1794|note3=|repealed=y|archived=n|}}

| {{|Glamorgan Roads Act 1795|public|156|30-12-1794|note3=|repealed=y|archived=n|}}

| {{|Richmond to Lancaster Road Act 1795|public|157|30-12-1794|note3=|repealed=y|archived=n|}}

| {{|Doncaster Road and Bridges Act 1795|public|158|30-12-1794|note3=|repealed=y|archived=n|}}

| {{|Elland to Leeds Road Act 1795|public|159|30-12-1794|note3=|repealed=y|archived=n|}}

| {{|Rochdale Road Act 1795|public|160|30-12-1794|note3=|repealed=y|archived=n|}}

| {{|Aberdeen Roads Act 1795|public|161|30-12-1794|note3=|repealed=y|archived=n|}}

| {{|Basingstoke to Winchester Road Act 1795|public|162|30-12-1794|note3=|repealed=y|archived=n|}}

| {{|Bedford and Hertford Roads Act 1795|public|163|30-12-1794|note3=|repealed=y|archived=n|}}

| {{|Yorkshire and Derby Roads Act 1795|public|164|30-12-1794|note3=|repealed=y|archived=n|}}

| {{|Kent Roads Act 1795|public|165|30-12-1794|note3=|repealed=y|archived=n|}}

| {{|Spalding Road Act 1795|public|166|30-12-1794|note3=|repealed=y|archived=n|}}

}}

Private acts

| {{|Hanley Castle (Worcestershire) inclosure.|private|2|30-12-1794|note3=|repealed=n|archived=n|}}

| {{|Greater Barr Aldridge (Staffordshire) inclosure.|private|3|30-12-1794|note3=|repealed=n|archived=n|}}

| {{|Bishampton (Worcestershire) inclosure.|private|4|30-12-1794|note3=|repealed=n|archived=n|}}

| {{|North Pertherton (Somerset) inclosure.|private|5|30-12-1794|note3=|repealed=n|archived=n|}}

| {{|St. Martin Stamford Baron (Northamptonshire) inclosure.|private|6|30-12-1794|note3=|repealed=n|archived=n|}}

| {{|Prees, Darlestone, Fauls, Mickley, Willaston, Morton Say, Longford, Stanton-upon-Hindheath (Salop.) inclosure.|private|7|30-12-1794|note3=|repealed=n|archived=n|}}

| {{|Bridge Casterton (Rutland) inclosure.|private|8|30-12-1794|note3=|repealed=n|archived=n|}}

| {{|Naturalization of John Cankrien.|private|9|30-12-1794|note3=|repealed=n|archived=n|}}

| {{|Naturalization of Frederick Winzer and Simon Bethmann.|private|10|30-12-1794|note3=|repealed=n|archived=n|}}

| {{|Naturalization of John Van Yzendoorn (an infant).|private|11|30-12-1794|note3=|repealed=n|archived=n|}}

| {{|Naturalization of Peter Schmidtmeyer.|private|12|30-12-1794|note3=|repealed=n|archived=n|}}

| {{|Naturalization of Matthew Wiss.|private|13|30-12-1794|note3=|repealed=n|archived=n|}}

| {{|Cold-Aston or Aston-Blank (Gloucestershire) inclosure.|private|14|30-12-1794|note3=|repealed=n|archived=n|}}

| {{|Penley (Flintshire) inclosure.|private|15|30-12-1794|note3=|repealed=n|archived=n|}}

| {{|Winterborne Earls and Allington (Wiltshire) allotments.|private|16|30-12-1794|note3=|repealed=n|archived=n|}}

| {{|Bintry and Twyford (Norfolk) inclosure.|private|17|30-12-1794|note3=|repealed=n|archived=n|}}

| {{|William Brydges' estate: sale of an estate in Hereford for charitable purposes.|private|18|30-12-1794|note3=|repealed=n|archived=n|}}

| {{|Westcott and Middle Barton (Oxfordshire) inclosure.|private|19|30-12-1794|note3=|repealed=n|archived=n|}}

| {{|Burnham (Somerset) inclosure.|private|20|30-12-1794|note3=|repealed=n|archived=n|}}

| {{|Wigginton (Oxfordshire) inclosure.|private|21|30-12-1794|note3=|repealed=n|archived=n|}}

| {{|Banwell (Somerset) inclosure.|private|22|30-12-1794|note3=|repealed=n|archived=n|}}

| {{|East Lexham and Great Dunham (Norfolk) inclosure.|private|23|30-12-1794|note3=|repealed=n|archived=n|}}

| {{|Great Catworth (Huntingdonshire, Northamptonshire) inclosure.|private|24|30-12-1794|note3=|repealed=n|archived=n|}}

| {{|Wornditch (Huntingdonshire) inclosure.|private|25|30-12-1794|note3=|repealed=n|archived=n|}}

| {{|Richard Palmer's estate:vesting settled estates in Sonning (Berkshire), and settling other lands in lieu.|private|26|30-12-1794|note3=|repealed=n|archived=n|}}

| {{|Rector of St. Leonard's, Vicar of Heavitree's (Devon) and John Baring's estates: exchanges.|private|27|30-12-1794|note3=|repealed=n|archived=n|}}

| {{|Roger Jennings's estate: vesting Soddylt Hall and other property in Salop. in trustees for sale.|private|28|30-12-1794|note3=|repealed=n|archived=n|}}

| {{|Sir Francis Basset's estate: discharging Penwerris and lands near Penryn (Cornwall) from settlements, and settling other property in lieu.|private|29|30-12-1794|note3=|repealed=n|archived=n|}}

| {{|Bishop of Ely's estate: power to grant leases in the Isle of Ely.|private|30|30-12-1794|note3=|repealed=n|archived=n|}}

| {{|William Bamford's estate: power to grant building leases of estates in Lancashire and Cheshire.|private|31|30-12-1794|note3=|repealed=n|archived=n|}}

| {{|Sir Thomas Kyffin's estate: vesting in trustees for payment of his mortgage and specialty debts.|private|32|30-12-1794|note3=|repealed=n|archived=n|}}

| {{|Steeple Claydon (Buckinghamshire) inclosure.|private|33|30-12-1794|note3=|repealed=n|archived=n|}}

| {{|Newton Regis and Clifton Campville (Warwickshire and Staffordshire) inclosure.|private|34|30-12-1794|note3=|repealed=n|archived=n|}}

| {{|Aston Abbots (Buckinghamshire) inclosure.|private|35|30-12-1794|note3=|repealed=n|archived=n|}}

| {{|Holme upon the Wolds (Yorkshire, East Riding) inclosure.|private|36|30-12-1794|note3=|repealed=n|archived=n|}}

| {{|Padbury (Buckinghamshire) inclosure.|private|37|30-12-1794|note3=|repealed=n|archived=n|}}

| {{|Tirley (Gloucestershire) inclosure.|private|38|30-12-1794|note3=|repealed=n|archived=n|}}

| {{|Cheddar (Somerset) inclosure.|private|39|30-12-1794|note3=|repealed=n|archived=n|}}

| {{|Elstub and Everley (Wiltshire) inclosure.|private|40|30-12-1794|note3=|repealed=n|archived=n|}}

| {{|Upton (Nottinghamshire) inclosure.|private|41|30-12-1794|note3=|repealed=n|archived=n|}}

| {{|Caunton (Nottinghamshire) inclosure.|private|42|30-12-1794|note3=|repealed=n|archived=n|}}

| {{|Henlow (Bedfordshire) inclosure.|private|43|30-12-1794|note3=|repealed=n|archived=n|}}

| {{|Sir Henry Vane: change of name and arms to Tempest.|private|44|30-12-1794|note3=|repealed=n|archived=n|}}

| {{|Naturalization of Jacqueline Comte de Hompesch and James Bouwens.|private|45|30-12-1794|note3=|repealed=n|archived=n|}}

| {{|Cleckheaton (Yorkshire, West Riding) inclosure.|private|46|30-12-1794|note3=|repealed=n|archived=n|}}

| {{|Ratley (Warwickshire) inclosure.|private|47|30-12-1794|note3=|repealed=n|archived=n|}}

| {{|Wintringham (Lincolnshire) inclosure.|private|48|30-12-1794|note3=|repealed=n|archived=n|}}

| {{|Duke of Argyll's and Archibald Munro's estates: exchange.|private|49|30-12-1794|note3=|repealed=n|archived=n|}}

| {{|Henry Gally's estate: vesting an estate in Huntingdonshire, in exchange for one in Yorkshire to be settled in lieu.|private|50|30-12-1794|note3=|repealed=n|archived=n|}}

| {{|Robert Rushbrooke's and Marquis Cornwallis's estates: exchange.|private|51|30-12-1794|note3=|repealed=n|archived=n|}}

| {{|John Dolphin's estate: sale of estates in Staffordshire for payment of portions.|private|52|30-12-1794|note3=|repealed=n|archived=n|}}

| {{|Clarke's Charity Lands: power to make building leases, leases upon rack rents and conveyances in fee under reserved yearly rents.|private|53|30-12-1794|note3=|repealed=n|archived=n|}}

| {{|Smith's Charity Estate: vesting of part in trustees to be sold to John Pardoe, purchase and settlement of other estates in lieu, and regulation provisions.|private|54|30-12-1794|note3=|repealed=n|archived=n|}}

| {{|Sir Edward Knatchbull's, Sir Joseph Banks's and Sir Henry Gott's estates: partition in Kent and Sussex.|private|55|30-12-1794|note3=|repealed=n|archived=n|}}

| {{|Congleton (Cheshire) inclosure, poor rates and other taxes.|private|56|30-12-1794|note3=|repealed=n|archived=n|}}

| {{|Marcle, Wolton and Kinaston (Herefordshire) inclosure.|private|57|30-12-1794|note3=|repealed=n|archived=n|}}

| {{|Brigstock, Stanion and Sudborough Green (Northamptonshire) inclosure and Geddington Chase and Rockingham Forest allotment of lands.|private|58|30-12-1794|note3=|repealed=n|archived=n|}}

| {{|Naturalization of Felix Raper.|private|59|30-12-1794|note3=|repealed=n|archived=n|}}

| {{|Samuel and Elizabeth Brydges' estate: vesting estates in Kent in trustees, for sale, and purchase of other estates to be settled in lieu.|private|60|30-12-1794|note3=|repealed=n|archived=n|}}

| {{|Trustees of William Tovey's estates: substituting Henry Maddock for John Finch, an absconded bankrupt.|private|61|30-12-1794|note3=|repealed=n|archived=n|}}

| {{|William Hulme's estate:|note1= amending an Act of 1770 (c. 51) (enabling trustees of Hulme's estate to grant building leases and increase the number of exhibitions at Brasenose College, Oxford), enabling the trustees to convey in fee, or grant leases of the trust estates, enabling them to make allowances to the exhibitioners at Brasenose College and other provisions.|private|62|30-12-1794|note3=|repealed=n|archived=n|}}

| {{|John Maddison's estate: vesting parts in trustees, to be sold under the direction of the Court of Chancery, and purchase and settlement of other estates in lieu.|private|63|30-12-1794|note3=|repealed=n|archived=n|}}

| {{|Wootton and Boreshill (Berkshire) inclosure.|private|64|30-12-1794|note3=|repealed=n|archived=n|}}

| {{|Osbournby and Mickling Meadow (Lincolnshire) inclosure.|private|65|30-12-1794|note3=|repealed=n|archived=n|}}

| {{|Scartho (Lincolnshire) inclosure.|private|66|30-12-1794|note3=|repealed=y|archived=n| |note4= }}

| {{|Sedgeford (Norfolk) inclosure.|private|67|30-12-1794|note3=|repealed=n|archived=n|}}

| {{|Hagworthingham (Lincolnshire) inclosure.|private|68|30-12-1794|note3=|repealed=n|archived=n|}}

| {{|Swarby (Lincolnshire) inclosure.|private|69|30-12-1794|note3=|repealed=n|archived=n|}}

| {{|Eaton Socon (Bedfordshire) inclosure.|private|70|30-12-1794|note3=|repealed=n|archived=n|}}

| {{|Hillingdon and Cowley (Middlesex) inclosure.|private|71|30-12-1794|note3=|repealed=n|archived=n|}}

| {{|Abbotts Bromley (Staffordshire) inclosure.|private|72|30-12-1794|note3=|repealed=n|archived=n|}}

| {{|Upper Eatington and Fulready (Warwickshire) inclosure and Lower Eatington Church.|private|73|30-12-1794|note3=|repealed=n|archived=n|}}

| {{|Barlbrough (Derbyshire) inclosure.|private|74|30-12-1794|note3=|repealed=n|archived=n|}}

| {{|Bisbrooke (Rutland) inclosure, division of Liddington Common between manors and extinguishment of rights of common in the Manor of Seaton.|private|75|30-12-1794|note3=|repealed=n|archived=n|}}

| {{|North Leverton and Habblesthorpe or Apesthorpe (Nottinghamshire) inclosure.|private|76|30-12-1794|note3=|repealed=n|archived=n|}}

| {{|South Leverton (Nottinghamshire) inclosure.|private|77|30-12-1794|note3=|repealed=n|archived=n|}}

| {{|Crawley or Husborn Crawley (Bedfordshire) inclosure.|private|78|30-12-1794|note3=|repealed=n|archived=n|}}

| {{|Kirkby in Ashfield (Nottinghamshire) inclosure.|private|79|30-12-1794|note3=|repealed=n|archived=n|}}

| {{|Great Hockham (Norfolk) inclosure.|private|80|30-12-1794|note3=|repealed=n|archived=n|}}

| {{|Barnard Castle (Durham) inclosure.|private|81|30-12-1794|note3=|repealed=n|archived=n|}}

| {{|Estates of Charles Chaplin, St. Michael's Hospital, Well and the Vicar of Well (Yorkshire): subjecting property and hereditaments in Well and Snape to rights and trusts benefiting the hospital and to a portion benefiting the vicar.|private|82|30-12-1794|note3=|repealed=n|archived=n|}}

| {{|Bishop of London: power to grant a building lease of lands in Paddington.|private|83|30-12-1794|note3=|repealed=n|archived=n|}}

| {{|Reverend William Goddard's estate: vesting estates in Wiltshire in trustees, for sale, for the discharge of incumbrances, and, out of any residue, purchase of other estates and settlement in lieu.|private|84|30-12-1794|note3=|repealed=n|archived=n|}}

| {{|Poulton (Wiltshire) inclosure.|private|85|30-12-1794|note3=|repealed=n|archived=n|}}

| {{|Hasfield (Gloucestershire) inclosure.|private|86|30-12-1794|note3=|repealed=n|archived=n|}}

| {{|Parishes of St. Paul, St. Peter and St. Cuthbert, Bedford, inclosure.|private|87|30-12-1794|note3=|repealed=y|archived=n| |note4= }}

| {{|Patrick and Stuart Threipland's estates: exchange of lands at Barnhill and Fingask (Perth).|private|88|30-12-1794|note3=|repealed=n|archived=n|}}

| {{|Aldworth's Charity: sale of estate in Bentworth (Hampshire).|private|89|30-12-1794|note3=|repealed=n|archived=n|}}

| {{|Earl of Strafford's estate partition.|private|90|30-12-1794|note3=|repealed=n|archived=n|}}

| {{|Swillington (Yorkshire, West Riding) inclosure.|private|91|30-12-1794|note3=|repealed=n|archived=n|}}

| {{|Woodborough (Nottinghamshire) inclosure.|private|92|30-12-1794|note3=|repealed=n|archived=n|}}

| {{|Chattisley or Chaceley (Worcestershire) inclosure.|private|93|30-12-1794|note3=|repealed=n|archived=n|}}

| {{|Ropsley and Great and Little Humby (Lincolnshire) inclosure.|private|94|30-12-1794|note3=|repealed=n|archived=n|}}

| {{|Kelshall (Hertfordshire) inclosure.|private|95|30-12-1794|note3=|repealed=n|archived=n|}}

| {{|Naturalization of John Moillett.|private|96|30-12-1794|note3=|repealed=n|archived=n|}}

| {{|Londonthorpe (Lincolnshire) inclosure.|private|97|30-12-1794|note3=|repealed=n|archived=n|}}

| {{|Greystoke (Cumberland) inclosure.|private|98|30-12-1794|note3=|repealed=n|archived=n|}}

| {{|Grantham (Lincolnshire) inclosure.|private|99|30-12-1794|note3=|repealed=n|archived=n|}}

| {{|Eckington (Derbyshire) inclosure.|private|100|30-12-1794|note3=|repealed=n|archived=n|}}

| {{|East Stoke and Elston (Nottinghamshire) inclosure and ascertainment of parish boundaries.|private|101|30-12-1794|note3=|repealed=n|archived=n|}}

| {{|Harlaxton (Lincolnshire) inclosure.|private|102|30-12-1794|note3=|repealed=n|archived=n|}}

| {{|Millbrooke (Bedfordshire) inclosure.|private|103|30-12-1794|note3=|repealed=n|archived=n|}}

| {{|Owmby (Lincolnshire) inclosure.|private|104|30-12-1794|note3=|repealed=n|archived=n|}}

| {{|Stratton St. Margaret (Wiltshire) inclosure.|private|105|30-12-1794|note3=|repealed=n|archived=n|}}

| {{|Great Parndon (Essex) inclosure.|private|106|30-12-1794|note3=|repealed=n|archived=n|}}

| {{|Edgworth Moor (Lancashire) inclosure.|private|107|30-12-1794|note3=|repealed=n|archived=n|}}

| {{|Warboys (Huntingdonshire) inclosure.|private|108|30-12-1794|note3=|repealed=n|archived=n|}}

| {{|Akdridge or Aldrich (Staffordshire) inclosure.|private|109|30-12-1794|note3=|repealed=n|archived=n|}}

| {{|Ravensthorpe (Northamptonshire) inclosure.|private|110|30-12-1794|note3=|repealed=n|archived=n|}}

| {{|Naturalization of Peter Boileau.|private|111|30-12-1794|note3=|repealed=n|archived=n|}}

| {{|Forest of Knaresborough inclosure:|note1= enlarging the time and reviving powers granted by the Knaresborough Inclosure Act 1789 (c. 76) and the Forest of Knaresborough (Yorkshire) Inclosure Act 1774 (c. 54), amending the former Act and making them both more effectual.|private|112|30-12-1794|note3=|repealed=n|archived=n|}}
}}

36 Geo. 3

Public acts

| {{|Land Tax Act 1795|public|2|29-10-1795|note3=|repealed=y|archived=n|}}

| {{|Exportation and Importation Act 1795|public|3|29-10-1795|note3=|repealed=y|archived=n|}}

| {{|Importation Act 1795|public|4|29-10-1795|note3=|repealed=y|archived=n|}}

| {{|Exportation Act 1795|public|5|29-10-1795|note3=|repealed=y|archived=n|}}

| {{|Making of Starch Act 1795|public|6|29-10-1795|note3=|repealed=y|archived=n|}}

| {{|Treason Act 1795|public|7|29-10-1795|note3=|repealed=y|archived=n|}}

| {{|Seditious Meetings Act 1795|public|8|29-10-1795|note3=|repealed=y|archived=n|}}

| {{|Passage of Grain Act 1795|note1=|public|9|29-10-1795|note3=|repealed=y|archived=n|}}

| {{|Poor Relief Act 1795|public|10|29-10-1795|note3=|repealed=y|archived=n|}}

| {{|Lancaster Marsh: Drainage Act 1795|public|11|29-10-1795|note3=|repealed=y|archived=n|}}

| {{|National Debt Act 1795|public|12|29-10-1795|note3=|repealed=y|archived=n|}}

| {{|Excise Act 1795|public|13|29-10-1795|note3=|repealed=y|archived=n|}}

| {{|Additional Taxes Act 1795|public|14|29-10-1795|note3=|repealed=y|archived=n|}}

| {{|Duties on Horses Act 1795|public|15|29-10-1795|note3=|repealed=y|archived=n|}}

| {{|Duties on Horses Act 1795|public|16|29-10-1795|note3=|repealed=y|archived=n|}}

| {{|Duties on Horse Dealers' Licences Act 1795|public|17|29-10-1795|note3=|repealed=y|archived=n|}}

| {{|Drawbacks and Bounties Act 1795|public|18|29-10-1795|note3=|repealed=y|archived=n|}}

| {{|Duties on Salt Act 1795|public|19|29-10-1795|note3=|repealed=y|archived=n|}}

| {{|Distillation from Wheat, etc., Prohibition Act 1795|public|20|29-10-1795|note3=|repealed=y|archived=n|}}

| {{|Bounties Act 1795|public|21|29-10-1795|note3=|repealed=y|archived=n|}}

| {{|Making of Bread Act 1795|public|22|29-10-1795|note3=|repealed=y|archived=n|}}

| {{|Relief of the Poor Act 1795|public|23|29-10-1795|note3=|repealed=y|archived=n|}}

| {{|Mutiny Act 1795|public|24|29-10-1795|note3=|repealed=y|archived=n|}}

| {{|Grand Junction Canal (No. 4) Act 1795|note1=|public|25|29-10-1795|note3=|repealed=y|archived=n|}}

}}

Private acts

| {{|Henry Wakeman's divorce from Theodosia Freeman.|private|2|29-10-1795|note3=|repealed=n|archived=n|}}

| {{|Naturalization of Alexander Boue and John Albrecht.|private|3|29-10-1795|note3=|repealed=n|archived=n|}}

| {{|Naturalization of John Freese.|private|4|29-10-1795|note3=|repealed=n|archived=n|}}

| {{|Naturalization of Petrus Pottgeisser.|private|5|29-10-1795|note3=|repealed=n|archived=n|}}

| {{|Naturalization of Marie Anne Blaauw.|private|6|29-10-1795|note3=|repealed=n|archived=n|}}
}}

1796

36 Geo. 3

Public acts

| {{|London Assurance Act 1796|public|27|29-10-1795|note3=|repealed=y|archived=n|}}

| {{|Marine Mutiny Act 1796|public|28|29-10-1795|note3=|repealed=y|archived=n|}}

| {{|Exchequer Bills Act 1796|public|29|29-10-1795|note3=|repealed=y|archived=n|}}

| {{|Exchequer Bills Act 1796|public|30|29-10-1795|note3=|repealed=y|archived=n|}}

| {{|Loans or Exchequer Bills Act 1796|public|31|29-10-1795|note3=|repealed=y|archived=n|}}

| {{|Indemnity to Governors of West Indies Act 1796|public|32|29-10-1795|note3=|repealed=y|archived=n|}}

| {{|Bedford Level: Drainage Act 1796|public|33|29-10-1795|note3=|repealed=y|archived=n|}}

| {{|Thames and Severn Canal Act 1796|public|34|29-10-1795|note3=|repealed=y|archived=n|}}

| {{|Saint Bride's Church, City Act 1796|public|35|29-10-1795|note3=|repealed=y|archived=n|}}

| {{|Quartering of Soldiers Act 1796|public|36|29-10-1795|note3=|repealed=y|archived=n|}}

| {{|Courts, Newfoundland Act 1796|public|37|29-10-1795|note3=|repealed=y|archived=n|}}

| {{|Poor, Shropshire, etc. Act 1796|public|38|29-10-1795|note3=|repealed=y|archived=n|}}

| {{|Game Act 1796|public|39|29-10-1795|note3=|repealed=y|archived=n|}}

| {{|Continuance of Laws Act 1796|public|40|29-10-1795|note3=|repealed=y|archived=n|}}

| {{|Militia Pay Act 1796|public|41|29-10-1795|note3=|repealed=y|archived=n|}}

| {{|Warwick and Birmingham Canal Act 1796|public|42|29-10-1795|note3=|repealed=y|archived=n|}}

| {{|Ramsgate: Improvement Act 1796|public|43|29-10-1795|note3=|repealed=y|archived=n|}}

| {{|Kennet and Avon: Canal Act 1796|public|44|29-10-1795|note3=|repealed=y|archived=n|}}

| {{|Deal: Improvement Act 1796|public|45|29-10-1795|note3=|repealed=y|archived=n|}}

| {{|Devon: Canal Act 1796|public|46|29-10-1795|note3=|repealed=y|archived=n|}}

| {{|Dorset and Wiltshire: Canal Act 1796|public|47|29-10-1795|note3=|repealed=y|archived=n|}}

| {{|Somerset: Canal Act 1796|public|48|29-10-1795|note3=|repealed=y|archived=n|}}

| {{|Folkestone: Improvement Act 1796|public|49|29-10-1795|note3=|repealed=y|archived=n|}}

| {{|Wakefield: Improvement Act 1796|public|50|29-10-1795|note3=|repealed=y|archived=n|}}

| {{|Beccles: Improvement Act 1796|public|51|29-10-1795|note3=|repealed=y|archived=n|}}

| {{|Legacy Duty Act 1796|note1=|public|52|29-10-1795|note3=|repealed=y|archived=n|}}

| {{|Exportation Act 1796|public|53|29-10-1795|note3=|repealed=y|archived=n|}}

| {{|Game Act 1796|public|54|29-10-1795|note3=|repealed=y|archived=n|}}

| {{|Free Ports Act 1796|public|55|29-10-1795|note3=|repealed=y|archived=n|}}

| {{|Bounties Act 1796|public|56|29-10-1795|note3=|repealed=y|archived=n|}}

| {{|Indemnity Act 1796|public|57|29-10-1795|note3=|repealed=y|archived=n|}}

| {{|Trade with America Act 1796|public|58|29-10-1795|note3=|repealed=y|archived=n|}}

| {{|Controverted Elections Act 1796|public|59|29-10-1795|note3=|repealed=y|archived=n|}}

| {{|Metal Button Act 1796|note1=|public|60|29-10-1795|note3=|repealed=y|archived=n|}}

| {{|Coal Trade, London Act 1796|public|61|29-10-1795|note3=|repealed=y|archived=n|}}

| {{|Crown Lands in Northamptonshire, Grant to Earl of Westmorland Act 1796|public|62|29-10-1795|note3=|repealed=y|archived=n|}}

| {{|Crown Lands in Northamptonshire, Grant to Earl of Exeter Act 1796|public|63|29-10-1795|note3=|repealed=y|archived=n|}}

| {{|Finch Hatton's Estate Act 1796|public|64|29-10-1795|note3=|repealed=y|archived=n|}}

| {{|Saint Paul, Covent Garden: Church Rebuilding Act 1796|public|65|29-10-1795|note3=|repealed=y|archived=n|}}

| {{|Maidstone, Kent: Watching Act 1796|public|66|29-10-1795|note3=|repealed=y|archived=n|}}

| {{|Tavistock Canal Act 1796|public|67|29-10-1795|note3=|repealed=y|archived=n|}}

| {{|Aberdeen Harbour Act 1796|public|68|29-10-1795|note3=|repealed=y|archived=n|}}

| {{|Glamorganshire Canal Act 1796|public|69|29-10-1795|note3=|repealed=y|archived=n|}}

| {{|Leominster Canal Act 1796|public|70|29-10-1795|note3=|repealed=y|archived=n|}}

| {{|Ellesmere and Chester Canal Act 1796|public|71|29-10-1795|note3=|repealed=y|archived=n|}}

| {{|Ramsey (Huntingdonshire): Drainage, etc. Act 1796|public|72|29-10-1795|note3=|repealed=y|archived=n|}}

| {{|Bedford Level Act 1796|public|73|29-10-1795|note3=|repealed=y|archived=n|}}

| {{|National Debt Act 1796|public|74|29-10-1795|note3=|repealed=y|archived=n|}}

| {{|Metropolitan Justices Act 1796|public|75|29-10-1795|note3=|repealed=y|archived=n|}}

| {{|Merchandise in Neutral Ships Act 1796|public|76|29-10-1795|note3=|repealed=y|archived=n|}}

| {{|Mackerel Fishery Act 1796|public|77|29-10-1795|note3=|repealed=y|archived=n|}}

| {{|Customs Act 1796|public|78|29-10-1795|note3=|repealed=y|archived=n|}}

| {{|Customs Act 1796|public|79|29-10-1795|note3=|repealed=y|archived=n|}}

| {{|Stamps Act 1796|public|80|29-10-1795|note3=|repealed=y|archived=n|}}

| {{|Importation Act 1796|public|81|29-10-1795|note3=|repealed=y|archived=n|}}

| {{|Landing of Merchandise Act 1796|public|82|29-10-1795|note3=|repealed=y|archived=n|}}

| {{|Curates, etc. Act 1796|public|83|29-10-1795|note3=|repealed=y|archived=n|}}

| {{|Post Horse Duties Act 1796|public|84|29-10-1795|note3=|repealed=y|archived=n|}}

| {{|Mills Act 1796|note1=|public|85|29-10-1795|note3=|repealed=y|archived=n|}}

| {{|Sale of Butter Act 1796|public|86|29-10-1795|note3=|repealed=y|archived=n|}}

| {{|Pawnbrokers Act 1796|public|87|29-10-1795|note3=|repealed=y|archived=n|}}

| {{|Hay and Straw Act 1796|note1=|public|88|29-10-1795|note3=|repealed=y|archived=n|}}

| {{|Land Tax Act 1796|public|89|29-10-1795|note3=|repealed=y|archived=n|}}

| {{|Bank of England Stock Act 1796|public|90|29-10-1795|note3=|repealed=y|archived=n|}}

| {{|Million Bank Act 1796|public|91|29-10-1795|note3=|repealed=y|archived=n|}}

| {{|London Militia Act 1796|public|92|29-10-1795|note3=|repealed=y|archived=n|}}

| {{|Swansea Harbour Act 1796|public|93|29-10-1795|note3=|repealed=y|archived=n|}}

| {{|Northam Bridge, Hampshire: Improvement Act 1796|public|94|29-10-1795|note3=|repealed=y|archived=n|}}

| {{|Warwick and Napton Canal Act 1796|note1=|public|95|29-10-1795|note3=|repealed=y|archived=n|}}

| {{|Ellesmere and Chester Canal Act 1796|public|96|29-10-1795|note3=|repealed=y|archived=n|}}

| {{|Duchy of Lancaster Act 1796|public|97|29-10-1795|note3=|repealed=y|archived=n|}}

| {{|Great Grimsby (Lincoln) Harbour Act 1796|public|98|29-10-1795|note3=|repealed=y|archived=n|}}

| {{|Everton, etc. (Nottinghamshire): Drainage, etc. Act 1796|public|99|29-10-1795|note3=|repealed=y|archived=n|}}

| {{|Marshland, Norfolk: Drainage Act 1796|public|100|29-10-1795|note3=|repealed=y|archived=n|}}

| {{|Gainsborough: Inclosure Act 1796|public|101|29-10-1795|note3=|repealed=y|archived=n|}}

| {{|Lincoln: Poor Relief Act 1796|public|102|29-10-1795|note3=|repealed=y|archived=n|}}

| {{|Saint Martin Outwich Church, City Act 1796|public|103|29-10-1795|note3=|repealed=y|archived=n|}}

| {{|Lottery Act 1796|public|104|29-10-1795|note3=|repealed=y|archived=n|}}

| {{|National Debt Act 1796|public|105|29-10-1795|note3=|repealed=y|archived=n|}}

| {{|Drawback Act 1796|public|106|29-10-1795|note3=|repealed=y|archived=n|}}

| {{|Longitude at Sea Act 1796|public|107|29-10-1795|note3=|repealed=y|archived=n|}}

| {{|Continuance of Laws Act 1796|public|108|29-10-1795|note3=|repealed=y|archived=n|}}

| {{|Aliens Act 1796|public|109|29-10-1795|note3=|repealed=y|archived=n|}}

| {{|Customs Act 1796|public|110|29-10-1795|note3=|repealed=y|archived=n|}}

| {{|Combination of Workmen Act 1796|public|111|29-10-1795|note3=|repealed=y|archived=n|}}

| {{|Registry of Ships Act 1796|public|112|29-10-1795|note3=|repealed=y|archived=n|}}

| {{|Importation Act 1796|public|113|29-10-1795|note3=|repealed=y|archived=n|}}

| {{|Families of Militiamen, etc. Act 1796|public|114|29-10-1795|note3=|repealed=y|archived=n|}}

| {{|Manning of the Navy Act 1796|public|115|29-10-1795|note3=|repealed=y|archived=n|}}

| {{|Militia Allowances Act 1796|public|116|29-10-1795|note3=|repealed=y|archived=n|}}

| {{|Window Duties Act 1796|public|117|29-10-1795|note3=|repealed=y|archived=n|}}

| {{|Fish Act 1796|public|118|29-10-1795|note3=|repealed=y|archived=n|}}

| {{|East India Merchants: Purchase of Land in City, etc. Act 1796|public|119|29-10-1795|note3=|repealed=y|archived=n|}}

| {{|East India Company Act 1796|public|120|29-10-1795|note3=|repealed=y|archived=n|}}

| {{|Whitby Harbour Act 1796|public|121|29-10-1795|note3=|repealed=y|archived=n|}}

| {{|National Debt Act 1796|public|122|29-10-1795|note3=|repealed=y|archived=n|}}

| {{|Duties on Wines, etc. Act 1796|public|123|29-10-1795|note3=|repealed=y|archived=n|}}

| {{|Duties on Dogs Act 1796|public|124|29-10-1795|note3=|repealed=y|archived=n|}}

| {{|Duty on Hats Act 1796|public|125|29-10-1795|note3=|repealed=y|archived=n|}}

| {{|Appropriation Act 1796|public|126|29-10-1795|note3=|repealed=y|archived=n|}}

| {{|East India Merchants: Land for Warehouses etc. Act 1796|public|127|29-10-1795|note3=|repealed=y|archived=n|}}

| {{|Farnborough and Seven Oaks Road Act 1796|public|128|29-10-1795|note3=|repealed=y|archived=n|}}

| {{|Wadeshill and Royston Road Act 1796|public|129|29-10-1795|note3=|repealed=y|archived=n|}}

| {{|North Shields and Newcastle-upon-Tyne Road Act 1796|public|130|29-10-1795|note3=|repealed=y|archived=n|}}

| {{|Dean Forest Roads Act 1796|public|131|29-10-1795|note3=|repealed=y|archived=n|}}

| {{|Coventry Roads Act 1796|public|133|29-10-1795|note3=|repealed=y|archived=n|}}

| {{|Kincardine (County) Roads Act 1796|public|132|29-10-1795|note3=|repealed=y|archived=n|}}

| {{|Perth and Queensferry Roads Act 1796|public|134|29-10-1795|note3=|repealed=y|archived=n|}}

| {{|Southampton Portsmouth and Sheet Bridge Roads Act 1796|public|135|29-10-1795|note3=|repealed=y|archived=n|}}

| {{|Wearmouth and Tyne Bridge Road Act 1796|public|136|29-10-1795|note3=|repealed=y|archived=n|}}

| {{|Blackburn and Addingham Road Act 1796|public|137|29-10-1795|note3=|repealed=y|archived=n|}}

| {{|Leeds and Harrogate Road Act 1796|public|138|29-10-1795|note3=|repealed=y|archived=n|}}

| {{|Perth Roads Act 1796|public|139|29-10-1795|note3=|repealed=y|archived=n|}}

| {{|Slough Roads Act 1796|public|140|29-10-1795|note3=|repealed=y|archived=n|}}

| {{|Old Stratford and Dunchurch Road Act 1796|public|141|29-10-1795|note3=|repealed=y|archived=n|}}

| {{|Little Yarmouth and Blytheburgh Road Act 1796|public|142|29-10-1795|note3=|repealed=y|archived=n|}}

| {{|Crossford Bridge and Altrincham Road Act 1796|public|143|29-10-1795|note3=|repealed=y|archived=n|}}

| {{|Blackburn Roads Act 1796|public|144|29-10-1795|note3=|repealed=y|archived=n|}}

| {{|Altrincham and Warrington Roads Act 1796|public|145|29-10-1795|note3=|repealed=y|archived=n|}}

| {{|Wolverhampton Roads Act 1796|public|146|29-10-1795|note3=|repealed=y|archived=n|}}

| {{|Bale and Dolgelly Roads Act 1796|public|147|29-10-1795|note3=|repealed=y|archived=n|}}

| {{|Macclesfield and Congleton Road Act 1796|public|148|29-10-1795|note3=|repealed=y|archived=n|}}

| {{|Bolton and St. Helens Road Act 1796|public|149|29-10-1795|note3=|repealed=y|archived=n|}}

| {{|Nottinghamshire Roads Act 1796|public|150|29-10-1795|note3=|repealed=y|archived=n|}}

| {{|Bedford and Woburn Road Act 1796|public|151|29-10-1795|note3=|repealed=y|archived=n|}}

| {{|Nottingham Roads. Act 1796|public|152|29-10-1795|note3=|repealed=y|archived=n|}}

}}

Private acts

| {{|Alvescot (Oxfordshire) inclosure.|private|8|29-10-1795|note3=|repealed=n|archived=n|}}

| {{|Awre (Gloucestershire) inclosure.|private|9|29-10-1795|note3=|repealed=n|archived=n|}}

| {{|Reymerstone, Letton, Cranwerth and Southberg (Norfolk) inclosure.|private|10|29-10-1795|note3=|repealed=n|archived=n|}}

| {{|Dunton Bassett (Leicestershire) inclosure.|private|11|29-10-1795|note3=|repealed=n|archived=n|}}

| {{|Great Woolstone (Buckinghamshire) inclosure.|private|12|29-10-1795|note3=|repealed=n|archived=n|}}

| {{|Rothwell Haigh (Yorkshire, West Riding) inclosure: removing a doubt concerning the Award.|private|13|29-10-1795|note3=|repealed=n|archived=n|}}

| {{|Northwold (Norfolk) inclosure.|private|14|29-10-1795|note3=|repealed=n|archived=n|}}

| {{|Nether Wallop (Hampshire) inclosure.|private|15|29-10-1795|note3=|repealed=n|archived=n|}}

| {{|Basing and Mapplederwell (Hampshire) inclosure.|private|16|29-10-1795|note3=|repealed=n|archived=n|}}

| {{|Kedewen, Hopton and Overgorther (Montgomeryshire) inclosure.|private|17|29-10-1795|note3=|repealed=n|archived=n|}}

| {{|Naturalization of John Lubbren.|private|18|29-10-1795|note3=|repealed=n|archived=n|}}

| {{|Naturalization of Maria Gordon or Allan.|private|19|29-10-1795|note3=|repealed=n|archived=n|}}

| {{|Naturalization of John Rebeback.|private|20|29-10-1795|note3=|repealed=n|archived=n|}}
}}

37 Geo. 3

Public acts

| {{|Land Tax Act 1796|public|2|27-09-1796|note3=|repealed=y|archived=n|}}

| {{|Militia Act 1796|public|3|27-09-1796|note3=|repealed=y|archived=n|}}

| {{|Manning of the Army and Navy Act 1796|public|4|27-09-1796|note3=|repealed=y|archived=n|}}

| {{|Manning of the Army and Navy (Scotland) Act 1796|public|5|27-09-1796|note3=|repealed=y|archived=n|}}

| {{|Professional Cavalry Act 1796|public|6|27-09-1796|note3=|repealed=y|archived=n|}}

| {{|Exportation and Importation Act 1796|public|7|27-09-1796|note3=|repealed=y|archived=n|}}

| {{|Importation Act 1796|public|8|27-09-1796|note3=|repealed=y|archived=n|}}

| {{|National Debt Act 1796|public|9|27-09-1796|note3=|repealed=y|archived=n|}}

| {{|National Debt Act 1796|public|10|27-09-1796|note3=|repealed=y|archived=n|}}

| {{|Indemnity Act 1796|public|11|27-09-1796|note3=|repealed=y|archived=n|}}

| {{|Merchandise in Neutral Ships Act 1796|public|12|27-09-1796|note3=|repealed=y|archived=n|}}

| {{|Dudley Canal Act 1796|public|13|27-09-1796|note3=|repealed=y|archived=n|}}

| {{|Excise Act 1796|public|14|27-09-1796|note3=|repealed=y|archived=n|}}

| {{|Customs Act 1796|public|15|27-09-1796|note3=|repealed=y|archived=n|}}

| {{|Stage Coach Duties Act 1796|public|16|27-09-1796|note3=|repealed=y|archived=n|}}

| {{|Duties on Distilleries (Scotland), etc. Act 1796|public|17|27-09-1796|note3=|repealed=y|archived=n|}}

| {{|Postage Act 1796|public|18|27-09-1796|note3=|repealed=y|archived=n|}}

| {{|Stamps Act 1796|public|19|27-09-1796|note3=|repealed=y|archived=n|}}

| {{|National Debt Act 1796|public|20|27-09-1796|note3=|repealed=y|archived=n|}}

| {{|Cape of Good Hope Trade Act 1796|public|21|27-09-1796|note3=|repealed=y|archived=n|}}

| {{|Militia Act 1796|public|22|27-09-1796|note3=|repealed=y|archived=n|}}

| {{|Professional Cavalry Act 1796|public|23|27-09-1796|note3=|repealed=y|archived=n|}}

| {{|Manning of the Army and Navy Act 1796|public|24|27-09-1796|note3=|repealed=y|archived=n|}}

| {{|Militia (Tower Hamlets) Act 1796|note1=|public|25|27-09-1796|note3=|repealed=y|archived=n|}}

| {{|Navy Victualling and Transport Bills Act 1796|public|26|27-09-1796|note3=|repealed=y|archived=n|}}

| {{|Loans to Grenada and Saint Vincent Traders Act 1796|public|27|27-09-1796|note3=|repealed=y|archived=n|}}
}}

Private acts

| {{|Naturalization of George Astor.|private|2|27-09-1796|note3=|repealed=n|archived=n|}}

| {{|Naturalization of Nicholas Horn.|private|3|27-09-1796|note3=|repealed=n|archived=n|}}

| {{|John Opie's divorce from Mary Bunn, and other provisions.|private|4|27-09-1796|note3=|repealed=n|archived=n|}}

| {{|Aller (Somerset) inclosure.|private|5|27-09-1796|note3=|repealed=n|archived=n|}}

| {{|South Normanton (Derbyshire) inclosure.|private|6|27-09-1796|note3=|repealed=n|archived=n|}}

| {{|Naturalization of Charles Gruneisen.|private|7|27-09-1796|note3=|repealed=n|archived=n|}}

| {{|Naturalization of Anthony Ravelli.|private|8|27-09-1796|note3=|repealed=n|archived=n|}}

| {{|Naturalization of Abram, Henry and Louis Borel and Stephen Azemar.|private|9|27-09-1796|note3=|repealed=n|archived=n|}}

| {{|Naturalization of John Steinberg and Charles Blaurock.|private|10|27-09-1796|note3=|repealed=n|archived=n|}}

| {{|Naturalization of George Choumert.|private|11|27-09-1796|note3=|repealed=n|archived=n|}}

| {{|Naturalization of Wynand de Gruyter Vink.|private|12|27-09-1796|note3=|repealed=n|archived=n|}}

| {{|Naturalization of Ulrich Hinrichs.|private|13|27-09-1796|note3=|repealed=n|archived=n|}}
}}

1797

37 Geo. 3

Public acts

| {{|Bodmin Canal Act 1797|public|29|27-09-1796|note3=|repealed=y|archived=n|}}

| {{|Grantham Canal Act 1797|public|30|27-09-1796|note3=|repealed=y|archived=n|}}

| {{|East India Company Act 1797|public|31|27-09-1796|note3=|repealed=y|archived=n|}}

| {{|Negotiations of Notes and Bills Act 1797|public|32|27-09-1796|note3=|repealed=y|archived=n|}}

| {{|Mutiny Act 1797 c 33|public|33|27-09-1796|note3=|repealed=y|archived=n|}}

| {{|Marine Mutiny Act 1797|public|34|27-09-1796|note3=|repealed=y|archived=n|}}

| {{|Land Tax Act 1797 c 35|public|35|27-09-1796|note3=|repealed=y|archived=n|}}

| {{|Caldon Canal Act 1797|public|36|27-09-1796|note3=|repealed=y|archived=n|}}

| {{|Trade with United States Act 1797|public|37|27-09-1796|note3=|repealed=y|archived=n|}}

| {{|Militia Pay Act 1797|public|38|27-09-1796|note3=|repealed=y|archived=n|}}

| {{|Manning of the Army and Navy Act 1797|public|39|27-09-1796|note3=|repealed=y|archived=n|}}

| {{|Bank (Scotland) Act 1797|public|40|27-09-1796|note3=|repealed=y|archived=n|}}

| {{|Quartering of Soldiers Act 1797|public|41|27-09-1796|note3=|repealed=y|archived=n|}}

| {{|Northampton: Improvement Act 1797|public|42|27-09-1796|note3=|repealed=y|archived=n|}}

| {{|Plymouth Dock Chapel Act 1797|public|43|27-09-1796|note3=|repealed=y|archived=n|}}

| {{|Ipswich: Improvement, etc. Act 1797|public|44|27-09-1796|note3=|repealed=y|archived=n|}}

| {{|Restriction on Cash Payments Act 1797|note1= (also known as Bank Restriction Act 1797)|public|45|27-09-1796|note3=|repealed=y|archived=n|}}

| {{|National Debt Act 1797|public|46|27-09-1796|note3=|repealed=y|archived=n|}}

| {{|John Yeldham's Estate Act 1797|public|47|27-09-1796|note3=|repealed=y|archived=n|}}

| {{|Tweed Fisheries Act 1797|public|48|27-09-1796|note3=|repealed=y|archived=n|}}

| {{|Eyemouth Harbour Act 1797|public|49|27-09-1796|note3=|repealed=y|archived=n|}}

| {{|Barmouth Harbour Act 1797|public|50|27-09-1796|note3=|repealed=y|archived=n|}}

| {{|Leicester Navigation Act 1797|note1=|public|51|27-09-1796|note3=|repealed=y|archived=n|}}

| {{|Fife Roads Act 1797|public|52|27-09-1796|note3=|repealed=y|archived=n|}}

| {{|Navy Pay, etc. Act 1797|public|53|27-09-1796|note3=|repealed=y|archived=n|}}

| {{|Gloucester and Berkeley Canal Act 1797|public|54|27-09-1796|note3=|repealed=y|archived=n|}}

| {{|Milbrooke Parish Church, Southampton Act 1797|public|55|27-09-1796|note3=|repealed=y|archived=n|}}

| {{|Whitney Bridge, Hereford Act 1797|public|56|27-09-1796|note3=|repealed=y|archived=n|}}

| {{|National Debt Act 1797|public|57|27-09-1796|note3=|repealed=y|archived=n|}}

| {{|Bridgnorth Bridge Act 1797|public|58|27-09-1796|note3=|repealed=y|archived=n|}}

| {{|Loan to Emperor of Germany Act 1797|public|59|27-09-1796|note3=|repealed=y|archived=n|}}

| {{|Stamps Act 1797|public|60|27-09-1796|note3=|repealed=y|archived=n|}}

| {{|Negotiation of Notes and Bills Act 1797|public|61|27-09-1796|note3=|repealed=y|archived=n|}}

| {{|Banks (Scotland) Act 1797|public|62|27-09-1796|note3=|repealed=y|archived=n|}}

| {{|Foreign Ships Act 1797|public|63|27-09-1796|note3=|repealed=y|archived=n|}}

| {{|Indemnity to Governors of West Indies Act 1797|public|64|27-09-1796|note3=|repealed=y|archived=n|}}

| {{|Middlesex County Rates Act 1797|public|65|27-09-1796|note3=|repealed=y|archived=n|}}

| {{|Kent Fortifications Act 1797|public|66|27-09-1796|note3=|repealed=y|archived=n|}}

| {{|Lincoln Drainage Act 1797|public|67|27-09-1796|note3=|repealed=y|archived=n|}}

| {{|Whittlesey Drainage Act 1797|public|68|27-09-1796|note3=|repealed=y|archived=n|}}

| {{|Taxes Act 1797|public|69|27-09-1796|note3=|repealed=y|archived=n|}}

| {{|Incitement to Mutiny Act 1797|public|70|06-06-1797|repealed=y|archived=n|An Act for the better Prevention and Punishment of Attempts to seduce Persons serving in His Majesty’s Forces by Sea or Land from their Duty and Allegiance to His Majesty, or to incite them to Mutiny or Disobedience.|note4= }}

| {{|Certain Mutinous Crews Act 1797|public|71|27-09-1796|note3=|repealed=y|archived=n|}}

| {{|Importation Act 1797|public|72|27-09-1796|note3=|repealed=y|archived=n|}}

| {{|Desertion of Seamen Act 1797|public|73|27-09-1796|note3=|repealed=y|archived=n|}}

| {{|East India Company Act 1797|public|74|27-09-1796|note3=|repealed=y|archived=n|}}

| {{|Tower Hamlets Militia Act 1797|public|75|27-09-1796|note3=|repealed=y|archived=n|}}

| {{|Bounty on Exportation Act 1797|public|76|27-09-1796|note3=|repealed=y|archived=n|}}

| {{|Free Ports Act 1797|public|77|27-09-1796|note3=|repealed=y|archived=n|}}

| {{|Pilots: Liverpool Act 1797|public|78|27-09-1796|note3=|repealed=y|archived=n|}}

| {{|Stepney: Improvements, Poor Relief Act 1797|public|79|27-09-1796|note3=|repealed=y|archived=n|}}

| {{|Saint Pancras: Improvements, etc. Act 1797|public|80|27-09-1796|note3=|repealed=y|archived=n|}}

| {{|Canals: Trent and Mersey Act 1797|public|81|27-09-1796|note3=|repealed=y|archived=n|}}

| {{|Subscriptions to Loan Act 1797|public|82|27-09-1796|note3=|repealed=y|archived=n|}}

| {{|Exportation and Importation Act 1797|public|83|27-09-1796|note3=|repealed=y|archived=n|}}

| {{|Importation Act 1797|public|84|27-09-1796|note3=|repealed=y|archived=n|}}

| {{|Relief of Prisoners Act 1797|public|85|27-09-1796|note3=|repealed=y|archived=n|}}

| {{|Ramsgate Harbour Act 1797|public|86|27-09-1796|note3=|repealed=y|archived=n|}}

| {{|Great Tower Hill: Improvement, etc. Act 1797|public|87|27-09-1796|note3=|repealed=y|archived=n|}}

| {{|Waterbeach Level (Cambridge, Isle of Ely): Drainage Act 1797|public|88|27-09-1796|note3=|repealed=y|archived=n|}}

| {{|Burnt Fen (Northampton): Drainage Act 1797|public|89|27-09-1796|note3=|repealed=y|archived=n|}}

| {{|Stamps Act 1797|public|90|27-09-1796|note3=|repealed=y|archived=n|}}

| {{|Restrictions on Cash Payments Act 1797|public|91|27-09-1796|note3=|repealed=y|archived=n|}}

| {{|Aliens Act 1797|public|92|27-09-1796|note3=|repealed=y|archived=n|}}

| {{|Indemnity Act 1797|public|93|27-09-1796|note3=|repealed=y|archived=n|}}

| {{|Bounty on Pilchards Act 1797|public|94|27-09-1796|note3=|repealed=y|archived=n|}}

| {{|Hampshire and Wiltshire Fisheries Act 1797|public|95|27-09-1796|note3=|repealed=y|archived=n|}}

| {{|Isle of Ely Drainage Act 1797|public|96|27-09-1796|note3=|repealed=y|archived=n|}}

| {{|Treaty with United States Act 1797|public|97|27-09-1796|note3=|repealed=y|archived=n|}}

| {{|Assise and Making of Bread, London Act 1797|public|98|27-09-1796|note3=|repealed=y|archived=n|}}

| {{|Continuance of Laws Act 1797|public|99|27-09-1796|note3=|repealed=y|archived=n|}}

| {{|Monmouth Canal Act 1797|public|100|27-09-1796|note3=|repealed=y|archived=n|}}

| {{|Aberdeen: Harbour Improvement Act 1797|public|101|27-09-1796|note3=|repealed=y|archived=n|}}

| {{|Scotch Distilleries Act 1797|public|102|27-09-1796|note3=|repealed=y|archived=n|}}

| {{|Militia Act 1797|public|103|27-09-1796|note3=|repealed=y|archived=n|}}

| {{|Slave Trade Act 1797|public|104|27-09-1796|note3=|repealed=y|archived=n|}}

| {{|House Duties Act 1797|public|105|27-09-1796|note3=|repealed=y|archived=n|}}

| {{|Duties on Horses Act 1797|public|106|27-09-1796|note3=|repealed=y|archived=n|}}

| {{|Duties on Servants Act 1797|public|107|27-09-1796|note3=|repealed=y|archived=n|}}

| {{|Duties on Clocks and Watches Act 1797|public|108|27-09-1796|note3=|repealed=y|archived=n|}}

| {{|Manning of the Navy, etc. Act 1797|public|109|27-09-1796|note3=|repealed=y|archived=n|}}

| {{|Customs Act 1797|public|110|27-09-1796|note3=|repealed=y|archived=n|}}

| {{|Stamps Act 1797|public|111|27-09-1796|note3=|repealed=y|archived=n|}}

| {{|Relief of Insolvent Debtors Act 1797|public|112|27-09-1796|note3=|repealed=y|archived=n|}}

| {{|Lottery Act 1797|public|113|27-09-1796|note3=|repealed=y|archived=n|}}

| {{|Loans or Exchequer Bills Act 1797|public|114|27-09-1796|note3=|repealed=y|archived=n|}}

| {{|National Debt Act 1797|public|115|27-09-1796|note3=|repealed=y|archived=n|}}

| {{|Militia Allowances Act 1797|public|116|27-09-1796|note3=|repealed=y|archived=n|}}

| {{|Trade with India Act 1797|public|117|27-09-1796|note3=|repealed=y|archived=n|}}

| {{|Slave Trade Act 1797|public|118|27-09-1796|note3=|repealed=y|archived=n|}}

| {{|Negroes Act 1797|public|119|27-09-1796|note3=|repealed=y|archived=n|}}

| {{|Negotiations of Bills and Notes Act 1797|public|120|27-09-1796|note3=|repealed=y|archived=n|}}

| {{|Southern Whale Fisheries Act 1797|public|121|27-09-1796|note3=|repealed=y|archived=n|}}

| {{|Forgery Act 1797|public|122|27-09-1796|note3=|repealed=y|archived=n|}}

| {{|Unlawful Oaths Act 1797|public|123|27-09-1796|note3=|repealed=y|archived=n|}}

| {{|Bankrupts Act 1797|public|124|27-09-1796|note3=|repealed=y|archived=n|}}

| {{|Exportation Act 1797|public|125|27-09-1796|note3=|repealed=y|archived=n|}}

| {{|Counterfeiting Coin Act 1797|public|126|27-09-1796|note3=|repealed=y|archived=n|}}

| {{|Meeting of Parliament Act 1797|public|127|19-07-1797|repealed=n|archived=n|An Act to shorten the Time now required for giving Notice of the Royal Intention of his Majesty, his Heirs and Successors, that the Parliament shall meet and be holden for the Dispatch of Business, and more effectually to provide for the Meeting of Parliament in the case of a Demise of the Crown.}}

| {{|Land Tax Act 1797 c 128|public|128|27-09-1796|note3=|repealed=y|archived=n|}}

| {{|Weymouth: Water Supply Act 1797|public|129|27-09-1796|note3=|repealed=y|archived=n|}}

| {{|Rye Harbour Act 1797|public|130|27-09-1796|note3=|repealed=y|archived=n|}}

| {{|Burlsedon Bridge, Southampton Act 1797|public|131|27-09-1796|note3=|repealed=y|archived=n|}}

| {{|Saltcoates Harbour Act 1797|public|132|27-09-1796|note3=|repealed=y|archived=n|}}

| {{|Thomas Macklin's Paintings Act 1797|public|133|27-09-1796|note3=|repealed=y|archived=n|}}

| {{|Duty on Horses Act 1797|public|134|27-09-1796|note3=|repealed=y|archived=n|}}

| {{|Legacy Duty Act 1797|public|135|27-09-1796|note3=|repealed=y|archived=n|}}

| {{|Stamps Act 1797|public|136|27-09-1796|note3=|repealed=y|archived=n|}}

| {{|Bank (Scotland) Act 1797|public|137|27-09-1796|note3=|repealed=y|archived=n|}}

| {{|Parliamentary Elections (Scotland) Act 1797|public|138|27-09-1796|note3=|repealed=y|archived=n|}}

| {{|Provisional Cavalry Act 1797|public|139|27-09-1796|note3=|repealed=y|archived=n|}}

| {{|Naval Courts-martial Act 1797|public|140|27-09-1796|note3=|repealed=y|archived=n|}}

| {{|Postage Act 1797|public|141|27-09-1796|note3=|repealed=y|archived=n|}}

| {{|East India Act 1797|note1=|public|142|27-09-1796|note3=|repealed=y|archived=n|}}

| {{|Weights and Measures Act 1797|public|143|27-09-1796|note3=|repealed=y|archived=n|}}

| {{|Appropriation Act 1797|public|144|27-09-1796|note3=|repealed=y|archived=n|}}

| {{|Rochdale and Bury Road Act 1797|public|145|27-09-1796|note3=|repealed=y|archived=n|}}

| {{|Rochdale and Bury and Sudden Roads Act 1797|public|146|27-09-1796|note3=|repealed=y|archived=n|}}

| {{|Norwich and North Walsham Road Act 1797|public|147|27-09-1796|note3=|repealed=y|archived=n|}}

| {{|Farnhurst Chichester and Delkey Road Act 1797|public|148|27-09-1796|note3=|repealed=y|archived=n|}}

| {{|York and Boroughbridge Road Act 1797|public|149|27-09-1796|note3=|repealed=y|archived=n|}}

| {{|Stockbridge Roads Act 1797|public|150|27-09-1796|note3=|repealed=y|archived=n|}}

| {{|Wem and Bron-y-Garth Road Act 1797|public|151|27-09-1796|note3=|repealed=y|archived=n|}}

| {{|Stratford and Long Compton Hill Roads Act 1797|public|152|27-09-1796|note3=|repealed=y|archived=n|}}

| {{|Kirkcudbright Roads Act 1797|public|153|27-09-1796|note3=|repealed=y|archived=n|}}

| {{|Devizes Roads Act 1797|public|154|27-09-1796|note3=|repealed=y|archived=n|}}

| {{|Chatham Roads Act 1797|public|155|27-09-1796|note3=|repealed=y|archived=n|}}

| {{|Dover Deal and Sandwich Road Act 1797|public|156|27-09-1796|note3=|repealed=y|archived=n|}}

| {{|Hulmes Chapel and Chelford Road Act 1797|public|157|27-09-1796|note3=|repealed=y|archived=n|}}

| {{|Liverpool Prescot and Warrington Roads Act 1797|public|158|27-09-1796|note3=|repealed=y|archived=n|}}

| {{|Wakefield and Sheffield Road Act 1797|public|159|27-09-1796|note3=|repealed=y|archived=n|}}

| {{|Halifax and Sheffield Road Act 1797|public|160|27-09-1796|note3=|repealed=y|archived=n|}}

| {{|Ayr (County) Roads Act 1797|public|162|27-09-1796|note3=|repealed=y|archived=n|}}

| {{|West Cowgate and Alemouth Road Act 1797|public|163|27-09-1796|note3=|repealed=y|archived=n|}}

| {{|Perth and Crieff Roads Act 1797|public|164|27-09-1796|note3=|repealed=y|archived=n|}}

| {{|Kirkby Lonsdale and Milnthorpe Road Act 1797|public|165|27-09-1796|note3=|repealed=y|archived=n|}}

| {{|Clackmannan and Perth Roads Act 1797|public|166|27-09-1796|note3=|repealed=y|archived=n|}}

| {{|Wellingborough and Northampton Road Act 1797|public|167|27-09-1796|note3=|repealed=y|archived=n|}}

| {{|Lincoln (City) Roads Act 1797|public|168|27-09-1796|note3=|repealed=y|archived=n|}}

| {{|Basingstoke Roads Act 1797|public|169|27-09-1796|note3=|repealed=y|archived=n|}}

| {{|Adderbury and Oxford Road Act 1797|public|170|27-09-1796|note3=|repealed=y|archived=n|}}

| {{|Kinross and Alloa Road Act 1797|public|171|27-09-1796|note3=|repealed=y|archived=n|}}

| {{|Salop Roads Act 1797|public|172|27-09-1796|note3=|repealed=y|archived=n|}}

| {{|Bolton Blackburn and Twisey Roads Act 1797|public|173|27-09-1796|note3=|repealed=y|archived=n|}}

| {{|Bury and Bolton Roads Act 1797|public|174|27-09-1796|note3=|repealed=y|archived=n|}}

| {{|Frome Roads Act 1797|public|175|27-09-1796|note3=|repealed=y|archived=n|}}

| {{|Leominster Roads Act 1797|public|176|27-09-1796|note3=|repealed=y|archived=n|}}

| {{|Newport Pagnel Roads Act 1797|public|177|27-09-1796|note3=|repealed=y|archived=n|}}

| {{|Bristol Roads Act 1797|public|178|27-09-1796|note3=|repealed=y|archived=n|}}

| {{|Cambridge and Arrington Roads Act 1797|public|179|27-09-1796|note3=|repealed=y|archived=n|}}

| {{|Fife (Country) Roads Act 1797|public|180|27-09-1796|note3=|repealed=y|archived=n|}}
}}

Private acts

| {{|Weston Zoyland (Somerset) inclosure.|private|15|27-09-1796|note3=|repealed=n|archived=n|}}

| {{|Street (Somerset) inclosure.|private|16|27-09-1796|note3=|repealed=n|archived=n|}}

| {{|Naturalization of Phillipp Muntz.|private|17|27-09-1796|note3=|repealed=n|archived=n|}}

| {{|William Bright's divorce from Hannah Lock.|private|18|27-09-1796|note3=|repealed=n|archived=n|}}

| {{|Charterhouse Hospital: enabling governors to sell property in Fulstow Marsh, Chappel and Tetney (Lincolnshire), and to purchase other property in lieu.|private|19|27-09-1796|note3=|repealed=n|archived=n|}}

| {{|Lichfield Cathedral:|note1= explaining and amending an Act of 1705 (c. 33) (augmenting number of canons residentiary and improving deanery and prebends), making further provision for the canons residentiary and adding to the fabric fund.|private|20|27-09-1796|note3=|repealed=n|archived=n|}}

| {{|Exton and Cutcombe (Somerset) inclosure.|private|21|27-09-1796|note3=|repealed=n|archived=n|}}

| {{|Marquis of Lansdowne: relief from disabilities in consequence of his having sat and voted in the House of Lords without having made the necessary oaths and declarations.|private|22|27-09-1796|note3=|repealed=n|archived=n|}}

| {{|Dunton (Bedfordshire) inclosure.|private|23|27-09-1796|note3=|repealed=n|archived=n|}}

| {{|Naturalization of Jacob Bagelmann, John Siffken and George Tatter.|private|24|27-09-1796|note3=|repealed=n|archived=n|}}

| {{|Swayfield and Corby (Lincolnshire) inclosure.|private|25|27-09-1796|note3=|repealed=n|archived=n|}}

| {{|Campton-cum-Shefford (Lincolnshire) inclosure.|private|26|27-09-1796|note3=|repealed=n|archived=n|}}

| {{|Harewood (Yorkshire) inclosure.|private|27|27-09-1796|note3=|repealed=n|archived=n|}}

| {{|Naturalization of Henry Wienhold.|private|28|27-09-1796|note3=|repealed=n|archived=n|}}

| {{|Naturalization of Anthony Libotton.|private|29|27-09-1796|note3=|repealed=n|archived=n|}}

| {{|Puriton (Somerset) inclosure.|private|30|27-09-1796|note3=|repealed=n|archived=n|}}

| {{|Huish Episcopi (Somerset) inclosure.|private|31|27-09-1796|note3=|repealed=n|archived=n|}}

| {{|Othery (Somerset) inclosure.|private|32|27-09-1796|note3=|repealed=n|archived=n|}}

| {{|Denny Martin: change of name and arms to Fairfax.|private|33|27-09-1796|note3=|repealed=n|archived=n|}}

| {{|Naturalization of Peter Runquist.|private|34|27-09-1796|note3=|repealed=n|archived=n|}}

| {{|Tring (Hertfordshire) inclosure.|private|35|27-09-1796|note3=|repealed=n|archived=n|}}

| {{|Barningham (Suffolk) inclosure.|private|36|27-09-1796|note3=|repealed=n|archived=n|}}

| {{|Acle (Norfolk) inclosure.|private|37|27-09-1796|note3=|repealed=n|archived=n|}}

| {{|Hitcham Rectory (Buckinghamshire) and Lord Grenville's estate: exchange of glebe lands for others.|private|38|27-09-1796|note3=|repealed=n|archived=n|}}

| {{|Arundel Estate: enabling an exchange and entailing Arundel Castle and manor and other estates (Sussex).|private|39|27-09-1796|note3=|repealed=n|archived=n|}}

| {{|Arundel manor enfranchisement and sale of tithes.|private|40|27-09-1796|note3=|repealed=n|archived=n|}}

| {{|Sawley and Winksley (Yorkshire) inclosure.|private|41|27-09-1796|note3=|repealed=n|archived=n|}}

| {{|Wing (Buckinghamshire) inclosure.|private|42|27-09-1796|note3=|repealed=n|archived=n|}}

| {{|Halton Moor (Lancashire) inclosure.|private|43|27-09-1796|note3=|repealed=n|archived=n|}}

| {{|Hornby (Lancashire) inclosure.|private|44|27-09-1796|note3=|repealed=n|archived=n|}}

| {{|Etwall (Derbyshire) inclosure.|private|45|27-09-1796|note3=|repealed=n|archived=n|}}

| {{|Chewton Mendip (Somerset) inclosure.|private|46|27-09-1796|note3=|repealed=n|archived=n|}}

| {{|Over Kellet Moor (Lancashire) inclosure.|private|47|27-09-1796|note3=|repealed=n|archived=n|}}

| {{|Dalton (Yorkshire, West Riding) inclosure.|private|48|27-09-1796|note3=|repealed=n|archived=n|}}

| {{|Thornborough (Buckinghamshire) inclosure.|private|49|27-09-1796|note3=|repealed=n|archived=n|}}

| {{|Allcannings and Allington (Wiltshire) inclosure.|private|50|27-09-1796|note3=|repealed=n|archived=n|}}

| {{|Saham Tone (Norfolk) inclosure.|private|51|27-09-1796|note3=|repealed=n|archived=n|}}

| {{|Wingrave-with-Rowsham (Buckinghamshire) inclosure.|private|52|27-09-1796|note3=|repealed=n|archived=n|}}

| {{|Bedford (St. Mary Parish) inclosure.|private|53|27-09-1796|note3=|repealed=y|archived=n| |note4= }}

| {{|Uggeshall, Frostenden and South Cove (Suffolk) inclosure.|private|54|27-09-1796|note3=|repealed=n|archived=n|}}

| {{|Sotterly, Henstead with Hulverly, and Wrentham (Suffolk) inclosure.|private|55|27-09-1796|note3=|repealed=n|archived=n|}}

| {{|Harwood (Lancashire) inclosure.|private|56|27-09-1796|note3=|repealed=n|archived=n|}}

| {{|Barrow (Lincolnshire) inclosure.|private|57|27-09-1796|note3=|repealed=n|archived=n|}}

| {{|Lord Cadogan's divorce from Mary Churchill.|private|58|27-09-1796|note3=|repealed=n|archived=n|}}

| {{|Charlotte Woodhouse's estate: effecting her marriage settlement despite her infancy.|private|59|27-09-1796|note3=|repealed=n|archived=n|}}

| {{|Samuel Browne's estate: enabling trustees to settle the residue of his personal estate, and the produce of his real estate, upon his daughters' marriage settlements.|private|60|27-09-1796|note3=|repealed=n|archived=n|}}

| {{|George Hassell's estate: vesting in trustees, for sale, and purchase of another to be settled in lieu.|private|61|27-09-1796|note3=|repealed=n|archived=n|}}

| {{|Francis Chaplin's and Theophilus Buckworth's estates: partition (Lincolnshire).|private|62|27-09-1796|note3=|repealed=n|archived=n|}}

| {{|Sapperton (Derbyshire) inclosure.|private|63|27-09-1796|note3=|repealed=n|archived=n|}}

| {{|Chalgrave (Bedfordshire) inclosure.|private|64|27-09-1796|note3=|repealed=n|archived=n|}}

| {{|John Earl Spencer's estate (deceased):|note1= vesting estates at Mappowder and Plush (Dorset) and Inkpen and Kintbury (Buckinghamshire) in trustees, to be conveyed to George Earl Spencer, his estate at Chapel Brampton (Northamptonshire) to be settled in exchange and in lieu.|private|65|27-09-1796|note3=|repealed=n|archived=n|}}

| {{|Estates of Lord Ashburnham and Canterbury Cathedral: Ninfield Rectory and Ashburnham Vicarage advowson exchange (Sussex).|private|66|27-09-1796|note3=|repealed=n|archived=n|}}

| {{|Mollington in Cropredy (Oxfordshire) inclosure.|private|67|27-09-1796|note3=|repealed=n|archived=n|}}

| {{|Whitchurch (Hampshire) inclosure.|private|68|27-09-1796|note3=|repealed=n|archived=n|}}

| {{|Whittlebury (Northamptonshire) inclosure.|private|69|27-09-1796|note3=|repealed=n|archived=n|}}

| {{|Walsall (Staffordshire) Grammar School's estate: enabling sale of mines and lands.|private|70|27-09-1796|note3=|repealed=n|archived=n|}}

| {{|Manors of Hornby and Tatham (Lancashire): enabling certain fee farm and customary tenants to purchase timber and underwood growing on their tenements, extinguishing their freehold fee farm and customary rents, boons, fines and other services of right and extinguishing the other tenants' customary rights to timber and underwood.|private|71|27-09-1796|note3=|repealed=n|archived=n|}}

| {{|James Davis's estate: vesting estates in Monmouthshire and Gloucestershire in trustees, to be sold, for the discharge of incumbrances; the surplus to be laid out in the purchase of others, to be settled in lieu.|private|72|27-09-1796|note3=|repealed=n|archived=n|}}

| {{|Elliot Salter's estate: sale of devised lands and hereditaments in Burnham (Buckinghamshire) and purchase of others to be conveyed in lieu.|private|73|27-09-1796|note3=|repealed=n|archived=n|}}

| {{|Coln St. Dennis (Gloucestershire) inclosure.|private|74|27-09-1796|note3=|repealed=n|archived=n|}}

| {{|Diddington (Huntingdonshire) inclosure.|private|75|27-09-1796|note3=|repealed=n|archived=n|}}

| {{|Ashcott (Somerset) inclosure.|private|76|27-09-1796|note3=|repealed=n|archived=n|}}

| {{|John Perrott's estate: vesting land and hereditamants in trustees, to be sold or exchanged for the discharge of a mortgage and for the purchase of other hereditaments to be settled in lieu, and enabling the trustees to grant building leases.|private|77|27-09-1796|note3=|repealed=n|archived=n|}}

| {{|Enabling Thomas Stinton to grant a lease of prebendal land.|private|78|27-09-1796|note3=|repealed=n|archived=n|}}

| {{|Charles Taylor's estate: vesting in trustees to be sold for the discharge of incumbrances and for the purchase of other estates to be settled in lieu.|private|79|27-09-1796|note3=|repealed=n|archived=n|}}

| {{|Sir William Lowther's estate: vesting settled estates in fee in exchange for others.|private|80|27-09-1796|note3=|repealed=n|archived=n|}}
}}

38 Geo. 3

Public general acts

| {{|Issue of Bank Notes (Scotland) Act 1797|public|2|02-11-1797|note3=|repealed=y|archived=n| |note4= }}

| {{|Importation Act 1797|public|3|02-11-1797|note3=|repealed=y|archived=n| |note4= }}

| {{|Duties on Malt, etc. Act 1797|public|4|02-11-1797|note3=|repealed=y|archived=n| |note4= }}

| {{|Land Tax Act 1797|note1=|public|5|02-11-1797|note3=|repealed=y|archived=n|}}

| {{|Army and Navy Act 1797|public|6|02-11-1797|note3=|repealed=y|archived=n| |note4= }}

| {{|Negotiation of Notes and Bills Act 1797|public|7|02-11-1797|note3=|repealed=y|archived=n| |note4= }}

| {{|Loans or Exchequer Bills Act 1797|public|8|02-11-1797|note3=|repealed=y|archived=n| |note4= }}

| {{|Continuance of Acts Act 1797|public|9|02-11-1797|note3=|repealed=y|archived=n| |note4= }}

| {{|Exportation Act 1797|public|10|02-11-1797|note3=|repealed=y|archived=n| |note4= }}

| {{|Duties on Distilleries Act 1797|public|11|02-11-1797|note3=|repealed=y|archived=n| |note4= }}

| {{|Militia Act 1797|public|12|02-11-1797|note3=|repealed=y|archived=n| |note4= }}

| {{|Augmentation of 60th Regiment Act 1797|public|13|02-11-1797|note3=|repealed=y|archived=n| |note4= }}

| {{|Indemnity Act 1797|public|14|02-11-1797|note3=|repealed=y|archived=n| |note4= }}

| {{|Marine Mutiny Act 1797|public|15|02-11-1797|note3=|repealed=y|archived=n| |note4= }}

}}

Local acts

}}

1798

38 Geo. 3

Public general acts

| {{|Militia Act 1798|public|17|02-11-1797|note3=|repealed=y|archived=n|}}

| {{|Supplementary Militia Act 1798|public|18|02-11-1797|note3=|repealed=y|archived=n|}}

| {{|Supplementary Militia Act 1798|public|19|02-11-1797|note3=|repealed=y|archived=n|}}

| {{|Loans or Exchequer Bills Act 1798|public|20|02-11-1797|note3=|repealed=y|archived=n|}}

| {{|Annuity to Lord Saint Vincent Act 1798|public|21|02-11-1797|note3=|repealed=y|archived=n|}}

| {{|Annuity to Lord Camperdown Act 1798|public|22|02-11-1797|note3=|repealed=y|archived=n|}}

| {{|Mutiny Act 1798|public|23|02-11-1797|note3=|repealed=y|archived=n|}}

| {{|Duties on Plate Act 1798|public|24|02-11-1797|note3=|repealed=y|archived=n|}}

| {{|Importation Act 1798|public|25|02-11-1797|note3=|repealed=y|archived=n|}}

| {{|Land Tax Act 1798|public|26|02-11-1797|note3=|repealed=y|archived=n|}}

| {{|Defence of the Realm Act 1798|public|27|02-11-1797|note3=|repealed=y|archived=n|An Act to enable His Majesty more effectually to provide for the Defence and Security of the Realm during the present War, and for indemnifying Persons who may suffer in their Property by such Measures as may be necessary for that Purpose.}}

| {{|Debts Due to the United Provinces, etc. Act 1798|public|28|02-11-1797|note3=|repealed=y|archived=n|}}

| {{|Exportation Act 1798|public|29|02-11-1797|note3=|repealed=y|archived=n|}}

| {{|Bounty on British Sail Cloth Exported Act 1798|public|30|02-11-1797|note3=|repealed=y|archived=n|}}

| {{|Duties on Distilleries Act 1798|public|31|02-11-1797|note3=|repealed=y|archived=n|}}

| {{|Quartering of Soldiers Act 1798|public|32|02-11-1797|note3=|repealed=y|archived=n|}}

| {{|Quarantine, etc. Act 1798|public|33|02-11-1797|note3=|repealed=y|archived=n|}}

| {{|Kent, Devon Fortifications Act 1798|public|34|02-11-1797|note3=|repealed=y|archived=n|}}

| {{|Continuance of Laws Act 1798|public|35|02-11-1797|note3=|repealed=y|archived=n|}}

| {{|Habeas Corpus Suspension Act 1798|public|36|02-11-1797|note3=|repealed=y|archived=n|}}

| {{|National Debt Act 1798|public|37|02-11-1797|note3=|repealed=y|archived=n|}}

| {{|Prize Causes Act 1798|public|38|02-11-1797|note3=|repealed=y|archived=n|}}

| {{|Importation and Exportation Act 1798|public|39|02-11-1797|note3=|repealed=y|archived=n|}}

| {{|Inhabited House, etc., Duties Act 1798|public|40|02-11-1797|note3=|repealed=y|archived=n|}}

| {{|Duties on Servants, etc. Act 1798|public|41|02-11-1797|note3=|repealed=y|archived=n|}}

| {{|Excise Act 1798|public|42|02-11-1797|note3=|repealed=y|archived=n|}}

| {{|Duties on Salt Act 1798|public|43|02-11-1797|note3=|repealed=y|archived=n|}}

| {{|Militia Act 1798|public|44|02-11-1797|note3=|repealed=y|archived=n|}}

| {{|Debts Due to Swiss Government Act 1798|public|45|02-11-1797|note3=|repealed=y|archived=n|}}

| {{|Manning of the Navy Act 1798|public|46|02-11-1797|note3=|repealed=y|archived=n|}}

| {{|National Debt Act 1798|public|47|02-11-1797|note3=|repealed=y|archived=n|}}

| {{|Land Tax Commissioners Act 1798|note1=|public|48|02-11-1797|note3=|repealed=y|archived=n|}}

| {{|Rochdale Canal Company Act 1798|public|49|02-11-1797|note3=|repealed=y|archived=n|}}

| {{|Aliens Act 1798|public|50|02-11-1797|note3=|repealed=y|archived=n|}}

| {{|Yeomanry Cavalry Act 1798|public|51|02-11-1797|note3=|repealed=y|archived=n|}}

| {{|Counties of Cities Act 1798|note1=|public|52|02-11-1797|note3=|repealed=y|archived=n|}}

| {{|Armorial Bearings Act 1798|public|53|02-11-1797|note3=|repealed=y|archived=n|}}

| {{|Excise Act 1798|public|54|02-11-1797|note3=|repealed=y|archived=n|}}

| {{|Militia Act 1798|public|55|02-11-1797|note3=|repealed=y|archived=n|}}

| {{|Stamps Act 1798|public|56|02-11-1797|note3=|repealed=y|archived=n|}}

| {{|Southern Whale Fisheries Act 1798|public|57|02-11-1797|note3=|repealed=y|archived=n|}}

| {{|British Fisheries Act 1798|public|58|02-11-1797|note3=|repealed=y|archived=n|}}

| {{|Silver Coin Act 1798|public|59|02-11-1797|note3=|repealed=y|archived=n|}}

| {{|Land Tax Perpetuation Act 1798|note1=|public|60|02-11-1797|note3=|repealed=y|archived=n|}}

| {{|Drawbacks, etc. Act 1798|public|61|02-11-1797|note3=|repealed=y|archived=n|}}

| {{|Assise of Bread Act 1798|public|62|02-11-1797|note3=|repealed=y|archived=n|}}

| {{|Isle of Man Trade Act 1798|public|63|02-11-1797|note3=|repealed=y|archived=n|}}

| {{|Militia Pay Act 1798|public|64|02-11-1797|note3=|repealed=y|archived=n|}}

| {{|Diseased Sheep, etc. Act 1798|public|65|02-11-1797|note3=|repealed=y|archived=n|}}

| {{|Militia Act 1798|public|66|02-11-1797|note3=|repealed=y|archived=n|}}

| {{|Exportation Act 1798|public|67|02-11-1797|note3=|repealed=y|archived=n|}}

| {{|Duties on Cinnamon, etc. Act 1798|public|68|02-11-1797|note3=|repealed=y|archived=n|}}

| {{|Gold Plate (Standard) Act 1798|note1=|public|69|02-11-1797|note3=|repealed=y|archived=n|}}

| {{|Militia Allowances Act 1798|public|70|02-11-1797|note3=|repealed=y|archived=n|}}

| {{|Copyright Act 1798|public|71|02-11-1797|note3=|repealed=y|archived=n|}}

| {{|Indemnity to Governors of West Indies Act 1798|public|72|02-11-1797|note3=|repealed=y|archived=n|}}

| {{|Packing, etc., of Butter Act 1798|public|73|02-11-1797|note3=|repealed=y|archived=n|}}

| {{|Regiment of Cornwall and Devon Miners Act 1798|public|74|02-11-1797|note3=|repealed=y|archived=n|}}

| {{|Lottery Act 1798|public|75|02-11-1797|note3=|repealed=y|archived=n|}}

| {{|Customs, etc. Act 1798|public|76|02-11-1797|note3=|repealed=y|archived=n|}}

| {{|Aliens Act 1798|public|77|02-11-1797|note3=|repealed=y|archived=n|}}

| {{|Newspaper Publication Act 1798|public|78|02-11-1797|note3=|repealed=y|archived=n|}}

| {{|Residence in France During the War Act 1798|public|79|02-11-1797|note3=|repealed=y|archived=n|}}

| {{|Duties on Servants Act 1798|public|80|02-11-1797|note3=|repealed=y|archived=n|}}

| {{|Taxation Act 1798|public|81|02-11-1797|note3=|repealed=y|archived=n|}}

| {{|Loans of Exchequer Bills Act 1798|public|82|02-11-1797|note3=|repealed=y|archived=n|}}

| {{|Loans of Exchequer Bills Act 1798|public|83|02-11-1797|note3=|repealed=y|archived=n|}}

| {{|Loans of Exchequer Bills Act 1798|public|84|02-11-1797|note3=|repealed=y|archived=n|}}

| {{|Stamps Act 1798|public|85|02-11-1797|note3=|repealed=y|archived=n|}}

| {{|Customs Act 1798|public|86|02-11-1797|note3=|repealed=y|archived=n|}}

| {{|Administration of Estates Act 1798|note1=|public|87|02-11-1797|note3=|repealed=y|archived=n|}}

| {{|Slave Trade Act 1798|public|88|02-11-1797|note3=|repealed=y|archived=n|}}

| {{|Salt Duties Act 1798|public|89|02-11-1797|note3=|repealed=y|archived=n|}}

| {{|Appropriation Act 1798|public|90|02-11-1797|note3=|repealed=y|archived=n|}}

| {{|Exchequer Bills Act 1798|public|91|02-11-1797|note3=|repealed=y|archived=n|}}

| {{|Scotch Distilleries Act 1798|public|92|02-11-1797|note3=|repealed=y|archived=n|}}

| {{|Duty on Taxed Carts Act 1798|public|93|02-11-1797|note3=|repealed=y|archived=n|}}

| {{|Provisional Cavalry Act 1798|public|94|02-11-1797|note3=|repealed=y|archived=n|}}

}}

Private acts

| {{|Hethersett (Norfolk) inclosure.|private|2|02-11-1797|note3=|repealed=n|archived=n|}}

| {{|Elsted Marsh (Sussex) inclosure.|private|3|02-11-1797|note3=|repealed=n|archived=n|}}

| {{|Naturalization of Henry Jolivet.|personal|4|02-11-1797|note3=|repealed=n|archived=n|}}

| {{|Naturalization of John Schmiding.|personal|5|02-11-1797|note3=|repealed=n|archived=n|}}

| {{|Naturalization of Augustus Pieschel.|personal|6|02-11-1797|note3=|repealed=n|archived=n|}}

| {{|Naturalization of John Wegener.|personal|7|02-11-1797|note3=|repealed=n|archived=n|}}

| {{|Lord Braybrooke: change of name and arms to Griffin.|personal|8|02-11-1797|note3=|repealed=n|archived=n|}}

| {{|Naturalization of Lewis Sack.|personal|9|02-11-1797|note3=|repealed=n|archived=n|}}

| {{|Middlezoy (Somerset) inclosure.|private|10|02-11-1797|note3=|repealed=n|archived=n|}}

| {{|Great or East Leke (Nottinghamshire) inclosure.|private|11|02-11-1797|note3=|repealed=n|archived=n|}}

| {{|James Fozard's divorce from Sarah Leckie, and other provisions.|personal|12|02-11-1797|note3=|repealed=n|archived=n|}}

| {{|Naturalization of John Fournier.|private|13|02-11-1797|note3=|repealed=n|archived=n|}}

| {{|Naturalization of John Iselin and Daniel Eckenstein.|private|14|02-11-1797|note3=|repealed=n|archived=n|}}

| {{|Naturalization of Henry Pelerin.|private|15|02-11-1797|note3=|repealed=n|archived=n|}}

| {{|Reverend Henry Chatfield's estate: vesting estates in Chiddingly (Sussex) and settling estates in Balcombe and West Hoathly in lieu.|private|16|02-11-1797|note3=|repealed=n|archived=n|}}

| {{|Askerton, Barony of Gilsland (Cumberland) inclosure.|private|17|02-11-1797|note3=|repealed=n|archived=n|}}

| {{|Upper and Nether Denton, Barony of Gilsland (Cumberland) inclosure.|private|18|02-11-1797|note3=|repealed=n|archived=n|}}

| {{|Sowerby (Yorkshire, North Riding) inclosure.|private|19|02-11-1797|note3=|repealed=n|archived=n|}}

| {{|Chilton (Somerset) inclosure.|private|20|02-11-1797|note3=|repealed=n|archived=n|}}

| {{|Emberton (Buckinghamshire) inclosure.|private|21|02-11-1797|note3=|repealed=n|archived=n|}}

| {{|Upton and Milton (Wiltshire) inclosure.|private|22|02-11-1797|note3=|repealed=n|archived=n|}}

| {{|Keyworth (Nottinghamshire) inclosure.|private|23|02-11-1797|note3=|repealed=n|archived=n|}}

| {{|Guiting Power (Gloucestershire) inclosure.|private|24|02-11-1797|note3=|repealed=n|archived=n|}}

| {{|Hawarden (Flintshire) inclosure.|private|25|02-11-1797|note3=|repealed=n|archived=n|}}

| {{|Bozeat (Northamptonshire) inclosure.|private|26|02-11-1797|note3=|repealed=n|archived=n|}}

| {{|Kelmscott (Oxfordshire) inclosure.|private|27|02-11-1797|note3=|repealed=n|archived=n|}}

| {{|Messingham (Lincolnshire) inclosure.|private|28|02-11-1797|note3=|repealed=n|archived=n|}}

| {{|Ulley (Yorkshire, West Riding) inclosure.|private|29|02-11-1797|note3=|repealed=n|archived=n|}}

| {{|Naturalization of Nicholas Wanostrocht.|private|30|02-11-1797|note3=|repealed=n|archived=n|}}

| {{|Naturalization of Jacob Reichard and Peter Poland.|private|31|02-11-1797|note3=|repealed=n|archived=n|}}

| {{|Portbury (Somerset) inclosure.|private|32|02-11-1797|note3=|repealed=n|archived=n|}}

| {{|George Pescod's (a lunatic) estate: enabling him, or his committee, to convey, surrender or assign those estates sold, or to be sold, under the decree of the Court of Chancery.|private|33|02-11-1797|note3=|repealed=n|archived=n|}}

| {{|Stanton (Suffolk) inclosure.|private|34|02-11-1797|note3=|repealed=n|archived=n|}}

| {{|Medstead and Bentworth (Hampshire) inclosure.|private|35|02-11-1797|note3=|repealed=n|archived=n|}}

| {{|Reydon (Suffolk) inclosure.|private|36|02-11-1797|note3=|repealed=n|archived=n|}}

| {{|Bradford Peverell (Dorset) inclosure.|private|37|02-11-1797|note3=|repealed=n|archived=n|}}

| {{|Rockborne (Hampshire) and Wichbury (Wiltshire) inclosure.|private|38|02-11-1797|note3=|repealed=n|archived=n|}}

| {{|Gisleham and Pakefield (Suffolk) inclosure.|private|39|02-11-1797|note3=|repealed=n|archived=n|}}

| {{|Sir John Honeywood's estate: vesting property in Suffolk in trustees, to be sold; other estates to be purchased, and settled in lieu, under the direction of the Court of Chancery.|private|40|02-11-1797|note3=|repealed=n|archived=n|}}

| {{|Torry and Elizabeth Elston's estate: vesting estates at Gonnerby, Manthorpe and Allington (Lincolnshire), in trustees, to be conveyed to Lord Brownlow; other hereditaments to be purchased and settled in lieu.|private|41|02-11-1797|note3=|repealed=n|archived=n|}}

| {{|Jacob and John Houblon's estates: exchange.|private|42|02-11-1797|note3=|repealed=n|archived=n|}}

| {{|Seymour and Phillis Baily's estate: vesting estates in Kent in trustees, to be sold for the discharge of incumbrances, and for the purchase, under the direction of the Court of Chancery, of other estates to be settled in lieu.|private|43|02-11-1797|note3=|repealed=n|archived=n|}}

| {{|Lichfield Cathedral:|note1= amending and explaining an Act of 1797 (c. 20) (explaining and amending an Act of 1705 (c. 33) (augmenting number of canons residentiary and improvement of deanery and prebends)), making further provision for the Canons Residentiary and adding to the fabric fund.|private|44|02-11-1797|note3=|repealed=n|archived=n|}}

| {{|Jones's Estate Act 1797|private|45|02-11-1797|note3=|repealed=y|archived=n| |note4= }}

| {{|Catcott (Somerset) inclosure.|private|46|02-11-1797|note3=|repealed=n|archived=n|}}

| {{|Sandy (Bedfordshire) inclosure.|private|47|02-11-1797|note3=|repealed=n|archived=n|}}

| {{|Wilbarston (Northamptonshire) inclosure.|private|48|02-11-1797|note3=|repealed=n|archived=n|}}

| {{|Bleathwood Common (Herefordshire) inclosure.|private|49|02-11-1797|note3=|repealed=n|archived=n|}}

| {{|Sicklinghall with Woodhall (Yorkshire, West Riding) inclosure.|private|50|02-11-1797|note3=|repealed=n|archived=n|}}

| {{|Shrewton (Wiltshire) inclosure.|private|51|02-11-1797|note3=|repealed=n|archived=n|}}

| {{|Weston Turville (Buckinghamshire) inclosure.|private|52|02-11-1797|note3=|repealed=n|archived=n|}}

| {{|Tweedmouth and Spittle Common (Durham) inclosure.|private|53|02-11-1797|note3=|repealed=n|archived=n|}}

| {{|Birmingham (Warwickshire) inclosure.|private|54|02-11-1797|note3=|repealed=n|archived=n|}}

| {{|Harston, Hauxton, Little Shelford and Newton (Cambridgeshire) inclosure.|private|55|02-11-1797|note3=|repealed=n|archived=n|}}

| {{|Kirkby Overblow (Yorkshire, West Riding) inclosure.|private|56|02-11-1797|note3=|repealed=n|archived=n|}}

| {{|Samuel Boddington's divorce from Grace Ashburner, and other provisions.|private|57|02-11-1797|note3=|repealed=n|archived=n|}}

| {{|Honourable and Reverend Thomas Twistleton's divorce from Charlotte, late Wattell, and other provisions.|private|58|02-11-1797|note3=|repealed=n|archived=n|}}

| {{|James Woodmason's divorce from Mary, late Gaville, and other provisions.|private|59|02-11-1797|note3=|repealed=n|archived=n|}}

| {{|Naturalization of Eberhard Rheinwald.|private|60|02-11-1797|note3=|repealed=n|archived=n|}}

| {{|Naturalization of Emily de Visme.|private|61|02-11-1797|note3=|repealed=n|archived=n|}}

| {{|Naturalization of John Brock.|private|62|02-11-1797|note3=|repealed=n|archived=n|}}

| {{|John Guitton's estate: vesting in trustees to be conveyed, and purchase of another estate to be settled in lieu.|private|63|02-11-1797|note3=|repealed=n|archived=n|}}

| {{|Sir Robert Lawley's estate: vesting estates in Staffordshire and Warwickshire in trustees, to be sold, and purchase and settlement of estates in Salop. in lieu.|private|64|02-11-1797|note3=|repealed=n|archived=n|}}

| {{|Whipsnade (Bedfordshire) inclosure and vesting a rentcharge in the churchwardens and overseers of the poor, to supplement the poor rate, as compensation.|private|65|02-11-1797|note3=|repealed=n|archived=n|}}

| {{|Chilton Trinity, Wembdon, Durleigh, and Bridgewater (Somerset) inclosure.|private|66|02-11-1797|note3=|repealed=n|archived=n|}}

| {{|Kensworth (Hertfordshire) inclosure.|private|67|02-11-1797|note3=|repealed=n|archived=n|}}

| {{|Sir Edward Lloyd's estate: vesting estates in trustees, to be sold, and purchase and settlement of other estates in lieu, under the direction of the Court of Chancery, and other provisions.|private|68|02-11-1797|note3=|repealed=n|archived=n|}}

| {{|Samuel Whitbread's estate: confirming a trustee's resignation and granting power to sell, exchange, change trustees and grant building leases.|private|69|02-11-1797|note3=|repealed=n|archived=n|}}

| {{|Le Gendre Pierce Starkie's estate: sale of timber from settled estates, purchase and settlement of other estates and permitting letting and conveying in fee for building purposes.|private|70|02-11-1797|note3=|repealed=n|archived=n|}}

| {{|Sir John Mordaunt's estate: vesting estates in the Earl of Peterborough and Monmouth, in lieu of other estates settled to the uses of his will.|private|71|02-11-1797|note3=|repealed=n|archived=n|}}

| {{|Thurcaston (Leicestershire) inclosure.|private|72|02-11-1797|note3=|repealed=n|archived=n|}}

| {{|Swithland (Leicestershire) inclosure.|private|73|02-11-1797|note3=|repealed=n|archived=n|}}

| {{|Mavis Enderby (Lincolnshire) inclosure.|private|74|02-11-1797|note3=|repealed=n|archived=n|}}

| {{|Sutton Veny (Wiltshire) inclosure.|private|75|02-11-1797|note3=|repealed=n|archived=n|}}

| {{|Hartington (Derbyshire) inclosure.|private|76|02-11-1797|note3=|repealed=n|archived=n|}}

| {{|Long Stow (Cambridgeshire) inclosure.|private|77|02-11-1797|note3=|repealed=n|archived=n|}}

| {{|Stone (Staffordshire) inclosure.|private|78|02-11-1797|note3=|repealed=n|archived=n|}}

| {{|Glastonbury (Somerset) inclosure.|private|79|02-11-1797|note3=|repealed=n|archived=n|}}

| {{|Caddington (Bedfordshire, Hertfordshire) inclosure.|private|80|02-11-1797|note3=|repealed=n|archived=n|}}

| {{|Swaffham Bulbeck (Cambridgeshire) inclosure and drainage.|private|81|02-11-1797|note3=|repealed=n|archived=n|}}

| {{|Warboys (Huntingdonshire) inclosure and drainage: amending Warboys Inclosure Act 1795 (c. 108), as it relates to land allotted in lieu of tithes.|private|82|02-11-1797|note3=|repealed=n|archived=n|}}

| {{|Naturalization of Carl Giesler.|private|83|02-11-1797|note3=|repealed=n|archived=n|}}

| {{|Kirk Deighton Rectory and Thomas Thornton's estates: exchange.|private|84|02-11-1797|note3=|repealed=n|archived=n|}}

| {{|John Hyde's (an infant) estate: vesting estates in his guardians to be sold to Holland Ackers, or another.|private|85|02-11-1797|note3=|repealed=n|archived=n|}}

| {{|Naturalization of James Hoolboom.|private|86|02-11-1797|note3=|repealed=n|archived=n|}}

| {{|Naturalization of William Brodum.|private|87|02-11-1797|note3=|repealed=n|archived=n|}}

| {{|Naturalization of John Holwhede.|private|88|02-11-1797|note3=|repealed=n|archived=n|}}
}}

Local acts

| {{|Macklin's Lottery.|local|3|02-11-1797|note3=|repealed=n|archived=n|}}

| {{|Leeds and Ripon Roads.|local|4|02-11-1797|note3=|repealed=n|archived=n|}}

| {{|Somersham Road (Huntingdonshire).|local|5|02-11-1797|note3=|repealed=y|archived=n| |note4= }}

| {{|Penrith and Chalk Beck Road.|local|6|02-11-1797|note3=|repealed=n|archived=n|}}

| {{|Sussex Roads.|local|7|02-11-1797|note3=|repealed=y|archived=n| |note4= }}

| {{|Wiltshire and Somerset Roads and Stokeford Bridge.|local|8|02-11-1797|note3=|repealed=y|archived=n| |note4= }}

| {{|Dumfriesshire Roads.|local|9|02-11-1797|note3=|repealed=y|archived=n| |note4= }}

| {{|Cirencester Roads.|local|10|02-11-1797|note3=|repealed=y|archived=n| |note4= }}
}}

39 Geo. 3

Public general acts

| {{|Duties upon Malt, etc. Act 1798|public|2|20-11-1798|note3=|repealed=y|archived=n|}}

| {{|Duties on Pensions, etc. Act 1798|public|3|20-11-1798|note3=|repealed=y|archived=n|}}

| {{|Army and Navy Act 1798|public|4|20-11-1798|note3=|repealed=y|archived=n|}}

| {{|Militia Act 1798|public|5|20-11-1798|note3=|repealed=y|archived=n|}}

| {{|Land Tax Redemption, etc. Act 1798|public|6|20-11-1798|note3=|repealed=y|archived=n|}}

| {{|National Debt Act 1798|public|7|20-11-1798|note3=|repealed=y|archived=n|}}
}}

1799

39 Geo. 3

Public general acts

| {{|Negotiations of Notes and Bills Act 1799|public|9|20-11-1798|note3=|repealed=y|archived=n|}}

| {{|Issue of Bank Notes (Scotland) Act 1799|public|10|20-11-1798|note3=|repealed=y|archived=n|}}

| {{|Grenada and Saint Vincent Traders Act 1799|public|11|20-11-1798|note3=|repealed=y|archived=n|}}

| {{|Continuance of Acts Act 1799|public|12|20-11-1798|note3=|repealed=y|archived=n|}}

| {{|Duties on Income Act 1799|public|13|20-11-1798|note3=|repealed=y|archived=n|}}

| {{|Supplementary Militia Act 1799|public|14|20-11-1798|note3=|repealed=y|archived=n|}}

| {{|Habeas Corpus Suspension Act 1799|public|15|20-11-1798|note3=|repealed=y|archived=n|}}

| {{|Courts, Newfoundland Act 1799|public|16|20-11-1798|note3=|repealed=y|archived=n|}}

| {{|Indemnity Act 1799|public|17|20-11-1798|note3=|repealed=y|archived=n|}}

| {{|Loans or Exchequer Bills Act 1799|public|18|20-11-1798|note3=|repealed=y|archived=n|}}

| {{|Marine Mutiny Act 1799|public|19|20-11-1798|note3=|repealed=y|archived=n|}}

| {{|Mutiny Act 1799|public|20|20-11-1798|note3=|repealed=y|archived=n|}}

| {{|Land Tax Redemption Act 1799|public|21|20-11-1798|note3=|repealed=y|archived=n|}}

| {{|Duties on Income Act 1799|public|22|20-11-1798|note3=|repealed=y|archived=n|}}

| {{|Provisional Cavalry Act 1799|public|23|20-11-1798|note3=|repealed=y|archived=n|}}

| {{|Negotiations of Notes and Bills Act 1799|public|24|20-11-1798|note3=|repealed=y|archived=n|}}

| {{|Issue of Bank Notes (Scotland) Act 1799|public|25|20-11-1798|note3=|repealed=y|archived=n|}}

| {{|Exportation Act 1799|public|26|20-11-1798|note3=|repealed=y|archived=n|}}

| {{|Importation Act 1799|public|27|20-11-1798|note3=|repealed=y|archived=n|}}

| {{|Bounty on Certain Linens Exported Act 1799|public|28|20-11-1798|note3=|repealed=y|archived=n|}}

| {{|Annuities Act 1799|public|29|20-11-1798|note3=|repealed=y|archived=n|}}

| {{|Annuities Act 1799|public|30|20-11-1798|note3=|repealed=y|archived=n|}}

| {{|Duties on Distilleries Act 1799|public|31|20-11-1798|note3=|repealed=y|archived=n|}}

| {{|Shipping Act 1799|public|32|20-11-1798|note3=|repealed=y|archived=n|}}

| {{|Loans or Exchequer Bills Act 1799|public|33|20-11-1798|note3=|repealed=y|archived=n|}}

| {{|Partridges Act 1799|note1=|public|34|20-11-1798|note3=|repealed=y|archived=n|}}

| {{|Militia Act 1799|public|35|20-11-1798|note3=|repealed=y|archived=n|}}

| {{|Quartering of Soldiers Act 1799|public|36|20-11-1798|note3=|repealed=y|archived=n|}}

| {{|Offences at Sea Act 1799|public|37|10-05-1799|repealed=n|archived=n|An Act for remedying certain Defects in the Law respecting Offences committed upon the High Seas.}}

| {{|Continuance of Acts Act 1799|public|38|20-11-1798|note3=|repealed=y|archived=n|}}

| {{|Stamps Act 1799|public|39|20-11-1798|note3=|repealed=y|archived=n|}}

| {{|Land Tax Redemption Act 1799|public|40|20-11-1798|note3=|repealed=y|archived=n|}}

| {{|Loans or Exchequer Bills Act 1799|public|41|20-11-1798|note3=|repealed=y|archived=n|}}

| {{|Duties on Income Act 1799|public|42|20-11-1798|note3=|repealed=y|archived=n|}}

| {{|Land Tax Redemption Act 1799|public|43|20-11-1798|note3=|repealed=y|archived=n|}}

| {{|Habeas Corpus Suspension Act 1799|public|44|20-11-1798|note3=|repealed=y|archived=n|}}

| {{|Punishment of Burning in the Hand Act 1799|public|45|20-11-1798|note3=|repealed=y|archived=n|}}

| {{|Lodgings of Justices of Assize Act 1799|public|46|20-11-1798|note3=|repealed=y|archived=n|}}

| {{|Negotiation of Notes and Bills Act 1799|public|47|20-11-1798|note3=|repealed=y|archived=n|}}

| {{|Issue of Bank Notes (Scotland) Act 1799|public|48|20-11-1798|note3=|repealed=y|archived=n|}}

| {{|Bail in Criminal Cases (Scotland) Act 1799|public|49|20-11-1798|note3=|repealed=y|archived=n|}}

| {{|Relief of Debtors Act 1799|public|50|20-11-1798|note3=|repealed=y|archived=n|}}

| {{|Transportation, etc. Act 1799|public|51|20-11-1798|note3=|repealed=y|archived=n|}}

| {{|Penitentiary Houses Act 1799|public|52|20-11-1798|note3=|repealed=y|archived=n|}}

| {{|Payment of Creditors (Scotland) Act 1799|public|53|20-11-1798|note3=|repealed=y|archived=n|}}

| {{|Tanners' Indemnity, etc. Act 1799|public|54|20-11-1798|note3=|repealed=y|archived=n|}}

| {{|Thirlage Act 1799|note1=|public|55|13-06-1799|repealed=n|archived=n|An Act for encouraging the improvement of lands subject to the servitude of thirlage in [...] Scotland.}}

| {{|Colliers (Scotland) Act 1799|note1=|public|56|20-11-1798|note3=|repealed=y|archived=n|}}

| {{|Indemnity to Governors of West Indies Act 1799|public|57|20-11-1798|note3=|repealed=y|archived=n|}}

| {{|Annuity to Sir James Marriott Act 1799|public|58|20-11-1798|note3=|repealed=y|archived=n|}}

| {{|Warehousing of Goods Act 1799|public|59|20-11-1798|note3=|repealed=y|archived=n|}}

| {{|National Debt Act 1799|public|60|20-11-1798|note3=|repealed=y|archived=n|}}

| {{|Customs Act 1799|public|61|20-11-1798|note3=|repealed=y|archived=n|}}

| {{|Militia Act 1799|public|62|20-11-1798|note3=|repealed=y|archived=n|}}

| {{|Duties on Sugar, etc. Act 1799|public|63|20-11-1798|note3=|repealed=y|archived=n|}}

| {{|National Debt Act 1799|public|64|20-11-1798|note3=|repealed=y|archived=n|}}

| {{|Bounty on Pilchards Act 1799|public|65|20-11-1798|note3=|repealed=y|archived=n|}}

| {{|Sheriff Deputies, etc. (Scotland) Act 1799|public|66|20-11-1798|note3=|repealed=y|archived=n|}}

| {{|Courts of Exchequer Act 1799|public|67|20-11-1798|note3=|repealed=y|archived=n|}}

| {{|Loans of Exchequer Bills Act 1799|public|68|20-11-1798|note3=|repealed=y|archived=n|}}

| {{|Loans of Exchequer Bills Act 1799|public|69|20-11-1798|note3=|repealed=y|archived=n|}}

| {{|Loans of Exchequer Bills Act 1799|public|70|20-11-1798|note3=|repealed=y|archived=n|}}

| {{|Loans of Exchequer Bills Act 1799|public|71|20-11-1798|note3=|repealed=y|archived=n|}}

| {{|Duties on Income Act 1799|public|72|20-11-1798|note3=|repealed=y|archived=n|}}

| {{|Legacy Duty Act 1799|note1=|public|73|20-11-1798|note3=|repealed=y|archived=n|}}

| {{|Post Horse Duties Act 1799|public|74|20-11-1798|note3=|repealed=y|archived=n|}}

| {{|Importation Act 1799|public|75|20-11-1798|note3=|repealed=y|archived=n|}}

| {{|Postage Act 1799|public|76|20-11-1798|note3=|repealed=y|archived=n|}}

| {{|Salt Duties Act 1799|public|77|20-11-1798|note3=|repealed=y|archived=n|}}

| {{|Duties on Distilleries (Scotland) Act 1799|public|78|20-11-1798|note3=|repealed=y|archived=n|}}

| {{|Unlawful Societies Act 1799|public|79|20-11-1798|note3=|repealed=y|archived=n|}}

| {{|Slave Trade Act 1799|public|80|20-11-1798|note3=|repealed=y|archived=n|}}

| {{|Unlawful Combinations of Workmen Act 1799|note1= (also known as Combination Act 1799)|public|81|12-07-1799|repealed=y|archived=n|An Act to prevent Unlawful Combinations of Workmen, prohibited trade unions and collective bargaining by British workers.}}

| {{|Militia of City of London Act 1799|public|82|20-11-1798|note3=|repealed=y|archived=n|}}

| {{|Auditors of Land Revenue Act 1799|public|83|20-11-1798|note3=|repealed=y|archived=n|}}

| {{|Annuity (Heirs of Sir Thomas Clarges) Act 1799|public|84|20-11-1798|note3=|repealed=y|archived=n|}}

| {{|Embezzlement Act 1799|public|85|20-11-1798|note3=|repealed=y|archived=n|}}

| {{|Spirit Licences Act 1799|public|86|20-11-1798|note3=|repealed=y|archived=n|}}

| {{|Importation Act 1799|public|87|20-11-1798|note3=|repealed=y|archived=n|}}

| {{|Importation and Exportation Act 1799|public|88|20-11-1798|note3=|repealed=y|archived=n|}}

| {{|East India Company Act 1799|public|89|20-11-1798|note3=|repealed=y|archived=n|}}

| {{|Militia Act 1799|public|90|20-11-1798|note3=|repealed=y|archived=n|}}

| {{|Lottery Act 1799|public|91|20-11-1798|note3=|repealed=y|archived=n|}}

| {{|Stamps Act 1799|public|92|20-11-1798|note3=|repealed=y|archived=n|}}

| {{|Forfeiture upon Attainder of Treason Act 1799|public|93|20-11-1798|note3=|repealed=y|archived=n|}}

| {{|Master of the Mint Act 1799|public|94|20-11-1798|note3=|repealed=y|archived=n|}}

| {{|Importation Act 1799|public|95|20-11-1798|note3=|repealed=y|archived=n|}}

| {{|Exportation Act 1799|public|96|20-11-1798|note3=|repealed=y|archived=n|}}

| {{|Militia Pay Act 1799|public|97|20-11-1798|note3=|repealed=y|archived=n|}}

| {{|Importation Act 1799|public|98|20-11-1798|note3=|repealed=y|archived=n|}}

| {{|Trade to the Levant Seas Act 1799|public|99|20-11-1798|note3=|repealed=y|archived=n|}}

| {{|British Ferries Society Act 1799|public|100|20-11-1798|note3=|repealed=y|archived=n|}}

| {{|Fisheries in Greenland Seas, etc. Act 1799|public|101|20-11-1798|note3=|repealed=y|archived=n|}}

| {{|Newfoundland Fisheries Act 1799|public|102|20-11-1798|note3=|repealed=y|archived=n|}}

| {{|Militia Allowances Act 1799|public|103|20-11-1798|note3=|repealed=y|archived=n|}}

| {{|Augmentation of 60th Regiment Act 1799|public|104|20-11-1798|note3=|repealed=y|archived=n|}}

| {{|Manufacture of Maidstone Geneva Act 1799|public|105|20-11-1798|note3=|repealed=y|archived=n|}}

| {{|Militia Act 1799|public|106|20-11-1798|note3=|repealed=y|archived=n|}}

| {{|Stamps Act 1799|public|107|20-11-1798|note3=|repealed=y|archived=n|}}

| {{|Land Tax Redemption Act 1799|public|108|20-11-1798|note3=|repealed=y|archived=n|}}

| {{|Forces of East India Company Act 1799|public|109|20-11-1798|note3=|repealed=y|archived=n|}}

| {{|Judges' Pensions Act 1799|note1=|public|110|20-11-1798|note3=|repealed=y|archived=n|}}

| {{|Importation Act 1799|public|111|20-11-1798|note3=|repealed=y|archived=n|}}

| {{|Importation Act 1799|public|112|20-11-1798|note3=|repealed=y|archived=n|}}

| {{|Appointment of Judges in Vacation Act 1799|public|113|20-11-1798|note3=|repealed=y|archived=n|}}

| {{|Appropriation Act 1799|public|114|20-11-1798|note3=|repealed=y|archived=n|}}

}}

Private acts

| {{|Thomas Jull: change of name and arms to Godfrey.|private|2|20-11-1798|note3=|repealed=n|archived=n|}}

| {{|Naturalization of Charles Hennings.|private|3|20-11-1798|note3=|repealed=n|archived=n|}}

| {{|Naturalization of John Teschemacher.|private|4|20-11-1798|note3=|repealed=n|archived=n|}}

| {{|Naturalization of Hermenegild Castellain.|private|5|20-11-1798|note3=|repealed=n|archived=n|}}

| {{|Naturalization of John Martin.|private|6|20-11-1798|note3=|repealed=n|archived=n|}}

| {{|Naturalization of John Heyman.|private|7|20-11-1798|note3=|repealed=n|archived=n|}}

| {{|Naturalization of Anthony Schick.|private|8|20-11-1798|note3=|repealed=n|archived=n|}}

| {{|Naturalization of John Gries.|private|9|20-11-1798|note3=|repealed=n|archived=n|}}

| {{|Naturalization of Adolphus Kent.|private|10|20-11-1798|note3=|repealed=n|archived=n|}}

| {{|Naturalization of Johann Wicke.|private|11|20-11-1798|note3=|repealed=n|archived=n|}}

| {{|Edward Ricketts's divorce from Honourable Cassandra Twistleton, and other provisions.|private|12|20-11-1798|note3=|repealed=n|archived=n|}}

| {{|Naturalization of Pierre Jacques and Pierre François Papillon.|private|13|20-11-1798|note3=|repealed=n|archived=n|}}

| {{|Naturalization of George Moller.|private|14|20-11-1798|note3=|repealed=n|archived=n|}}

| {{|Molesworth (Huntingdonshire) inclosure.|private|15|20-11-1798|note3=|repealed=n|archived=n|}}

| {{|Rackheath (Norfolk) inclosure.|private|16|20-11-1798|note3=|repealed=n|archived=n|}}

| {{|Leintwardine, Burrington, Downton, Aston and Elton (Herefordshire) inclosure.|private|17|20-11-1798|note3=|repealed=n|archived=n|}}

| {{|Oare (Wiltshire) inclosure.|private|18|20-11-1798|note3=|repealed=n|archived=n|}}

| {{|Remenham (Berkshire) inclosure.|private|19|20-11-1798|note3=|repealed=n|archived=n|}}

| {{|Nether Seal and Over Seal (Leicestershire, Derbyshire) inclosure and exchange of land.|private|20|20-11-1798|note3=|repealed=n|archived=n|}}

| {{|William Williams's divorce from Mary, late Willis, and other provisions.|private|21|20-11-1798|note3=|repealed=n|archived=n|}}

| {{|Naturalization of Godfrey Bitterman.|private|22|20-11-1798|note3=|repealed=n|archived=n|}}

| {{|Naturalization of Salomon Lange.|private|23|20-11-1798|note3=|repealed=n|archived=n|}}

| {{|Naturalization of Christian Witke.|private|24|20-11-1798|note3=|repealed=n|archived=n|}}

| {{|Naturalization of George Bong.|private|25|20-11-1798|note3=|repealed=n|archived=n|}}

| {{|Naturalization of John Marindin.|private|26|20-11-1798|note3=|repealed=n|archived=n|}}

| {{|Naturalization of John De Luc.|private|27|20-11-1798|note3=|repealed=n|archived=n|}}

| {{|Naturalization of Justin Audra.|private|28|20-11-1798|note3=|repealed=n|archived=n|}}

| {{|Naturalization of Adrien Papillon.|private|29|20-11-1798|note3=|repealed=n|archived=n|}}

| {{|Naturalization of Lorents Braun.|private|30|20-11-1798|note3=|repealed=n|archived=n|}}

| {{|Hevingham and Marsham (Norfolk) inclosure.|private|31|20-11-1798|note3=|repealed=n|archived=n|}}

| {{|Bromsgrove (Worcestershire) inclosure.|private|32|20-11-1798|note3=|repealed=n|archived=n|}}

| {{|William Ricketts's divorce from Lady Elizabeth Lambar, and other provisions.|private|33|20-11-1798|note3=|repealed=n|archived=n|}}

| {{|Naturalization of John Migault.|private|34|20-11-1798|note3=|repealed=n|archived=n|}}

| {{|Naturalization of John Humbert.|private|35|20-11-1798|note3=|repealed=n|archived=n|}}

| {{|Naturalization of Charles Rigaud.|private|36|20-11-1798|note3=|repealed=n|archived=n|}}

| {{|Naturalization of Francis Christin.|private|37|20-11-1798|note3=|repealed=n|archived=n|}}

| {{|Sophia Marchioness of Annandale's, and Sir Robert Myrton's estates:|note1= vesting parts of the lands and barony of Craigiehall (Linlithgow) and parts of the lands and barony of Leny (Edinburgh) in trustees, for sale or exchange, other lands to be purchased and settled in lieu, and vesting other parts of those lands and baronies in William Weir.|private|38|20-11-1798|note3=|repealed=n|archived=n|}}

| {{|Chipping Campden (Gloucestershire) inclosure.|private|39|20-11-1798|note3=|repealed=n|archived=n|}}

| {{|Leigh Common (Dorset) inclosure.|private|40|20-11-1798|note3=|repealed=n|archived=n|}}

| {{|Clevendon (Somerset) inclosure.|private|41|20-11-1798|note3=|repealed=n|archived=n|}}

| {{|Keninghall (Norfolk) inclosure.|private|42|20-11-1798|note3=|repealed=n|archived=n|}}

| {{|Bressingham and Fersfield (Norfolk) inclosure.|private|43|20-11-1798|note3=|repealed=n|archived=n|}}

| {{|Easton (Hampshire) inclosure.|private|44|20-11-1798|note3=|repealed=n|archived=n|}}

| {{|Amending Southill inclosure, 1797 (c. 110).|private|45|20-11-1798|note3=|repealed=n|archived=n|}}

| {{|Great Ellingham (Norfolk) inclosure.|private|46|20-11-1798|note3=|repealed=n|archived=n|}}

| {{|Horton (Buckinghamshire) inclosure.|private|47|20-11-1798|note3=|repealed=n|archived=n|}}

| {{|Marquis of Abercorn's divorce from Cecil Hamilton, and other provisions.|private|48|20-11-1798|note3=|repealed=n|archived=n|}}

| {{|John Stanton's divorce from Sarah Wright.|private|49|20-11-1798|note3=|repealed=n|archived=n|}}

| {{|Naturalization of Catherine Nassau.|private|50|20-11-1798|note3=|repealed=n|archived=n|}}

| {{|Naturalization of Henry von dem Busch.|private|51|20-11-1798|note3=|repealed=n|archived=n|}}

| {{|Naturalization of Diederick Bielfeld.|private|52|20-11-1798|note3=|repealed=n|archived=n|}}

| {{|Naturalization of Henry Berthoud.|private|53|20-11-1798|note3=|repealed=n|archived=n|}}

| {{|Bellbroughton (Worcestershire) inclosure.|private|54|20-11-1798|note3=|repealed=n|archived=n|}}

| {{|Rowley Regis (Staffordshire) inclosure.|private|55|20-11-1798|note3=|repealed=n|archived=n|}}

| {{|Francis Duke of Bedford's estates: vesting estates in fee simple and settling others in lieu.|private|56|20-11-1798|note3=|repealed=n|archived=n|}}

| {{|Robert Clutterbuck's estate: vesting in trustees to be sold, and applying the proceeds, under the direction of the Court of Chancery in the manner stated, and laying out the residue in the purchase of other estates, to be settled in lieu.|private|57|20-11-1798|note3=|repealed=n|archived=n|}}

| {{|Lewis Haussoullier's and Tryphena Trist's estates: partition of estates in Devon.|private|58|20-11-1798|note3=|repealed=n|archived=n|}}

| {{|Patrick Dunbar's estate: empowering the Court of Session to sell parts of the estate of Machermore (Kirkcudbright) for the payment of debts and charges.|private|59|20-11-1798|note3=|repealed=n|archived=n|}}

| {{|Greens Norton and Duncott (Northamptonshire) inclosure.|private|60|20-11-1798|note3=|repealed=n|archived=n|}}

| {{|Charlton Marshall (Dorset) inclosure.|private|61|20-11-1798|note3=|repealed=n|archived=n|}}

| {{|Mappowder (Dorset) inclosure.|private|62|20-11-1798|note3=|repealed=n|archived=n|}}

| {{|Hirst Courtney in Birkin (Yorkshire, West Riding) inclosure.|private|63|20-11-1798|note3=|repealed=n|archived=n|}}

| {{|Purton (Wiltshire) inclosure.|private|64|20-11-1798|note3=|repealed=n|archived=n|}}

| {{|Church Staunton (Devon) inclosure.|private|65|20-11-1798|note3=|repealed=n|archived=n|}}

| {{|Sherborne (Warwickshire) inclosure.|private|66|20-11-1798|note3=|repealed=n|archived=n|}}

| {{|Honington (Suffolk) inclosure.|private|67|20-11-1798|note3=|repealed=n|archived=n|}}

| {{|Ranworth (Norfolk) inclosure.|private|68|20-11-1798|note3=|repealed=n|archived=n|}}

| {{|Weardale in Stanhope (Durham) inclosure.|private|69|20-11-1798|note3=|repealed=n|archived=n|}}

| {{|Ulverstone (Lancashire) inclosure.|private|70|20-11-1798|note3=|repealed=n|archived=n|}}

| {{|Moorgate in Clarbrough (Nottinghamshire) inclosure.|private|71|20-11-1798|note3=|repealed=n|archived=n|}}

| {{|South Brent and Lympsham (Somerset) inclosure.|private|72|20-11-1798|note3=|repealed=n|archived=n|}}

| {{|Water Eaton (Staffordshire) inclosure.|private|73|20-11-1798|note3=|repealed=n|archived=n|}}

| {{|Harworth (Nottinghamshire) inclosure.|private|74|20-11-1798|note3=|repealed=n|archived=n|}}

| {{|Cheshunt (Hertfordshire) inclosure.|private|75|20-11-1798|note3=|repealed=n|archived=n|}}

| {{|Stratford-under-the-Castle and Milford (Wiltshire) inclosure.|private|76|20-11-1798|note3=|repealed=n|archived=n|}}

| {{|Shuldam Peard's divorce from Elizabeth Bligh, and other provisions.|private|77|20-11-1798|note3=|repealed=n|archived=n|}}

| {{|John Thoroton's divorce, and other provisions.|private|78|20-11-1798|note3=|repealed=n|archived=n|}}

| {{|Naturalization of Maria Gro'schner alias Huntley.|private|79|20-11-1798|note3=|repealed=n|archived=n|}}

| {{|Naturalization of Simeon D'Escury.|private|80|20-11-1798|note3=|repealed=n|archived=n|}}

| {{|Naturalization of William Korff.|private|81|20-11-1798|note3=|repealed=n|archived=n|}}

| {{|Naturalization of Abraham Cuvelje.|private|82|20-11-1798|note3=|repealed=n|archived=n|}}

| {{|Grasthorpe (Nottinghamshire) inclosure.|private|83|20-11-1798|note3=|repealed=n|archived=n|}}

| {{|Houghton and South Stoke (Sussex) inclosure.|private|84|20-11-1798|note3=|repealed=n|archived=n|}}

| {{|Long Preston (Yorkshire, West Riding) inclosure and drainage.|private|85|20-11-1798|note3=|repealed=n|archived=n|}}

| {{|Knayton (Yorkshire, North Riding) inclosure.|private|86|20-11-1798|note3=|repealed=n|archived=n|}}

| {{|Sandall Magna, Walton and Crigglestone (Yorkshire, West Riding) inclosure.|private|87|20-11-1798|note3=|repealed=n|archived=n|}}

| {{|Walton (Buckinghamshire) inclosure.|private|88|20-11-1798|note3=|repealed=n|archived=n|}}

| {{|Lyddington with Caldecott, and Uppingham (Rutland): inclosure, extinguishment of tithes, rights of common and deer browse in Beaumont Chace, and provision of compensation for such tithes and common rights.|private|89|20-11-1798|note3=|repealed=n|archived=n|}}

| {{|Althorpe (Lincolnshire) inclosure and drainage.|private|90|20-11-1798|note3=|repealed=n|archived=n|}}

| {{|Carlton-cum-Willingham (Cambridgeshire) inclosure.|private|91|20-11-1798|note3=|repealed=n|archived=n|}}

| {{|Richard Long's estate: vesting in trustees, for sale, and application of proceeds.|private|92|20-11-1798|note3=|repealed=n|archived=n|}}

| {{|Sir Henry Every's estate: vesting in trustees, for sale, for the discharge of charges, debts and incumbrances, and for the purchase from any residue, of other estates, to be settled in lieu.|private|93|20-11-1798|note3=|repealed=n|archived=n|}}

| {{|Watton-under-Edge Grammar School (Gloucestershire) and Nicholas Owen's estate: exchange.|private|94|20-11-1798|note3=|repealed=n|archived=n|}}

| {{|Pattingham and Patshull (Staffordshire) inclosure.|private|95|20-11-1798|note3=|repealed=n|archived=n|}}

| {{|Gosberton (Lincolnshire) inclosure.|private|96|20-11-1798|note3=|repealed=n|archived=n|}}

| {{|Yarkhill, Weston Beggard, Dormington and Stoke Edith (Herefordshire) inclosure.|private|97|20-11-1798|note3=|repealed=n|archived=n|}}

| {{|Axbridge (Somerset) inclosure.|private|98|20-11-1798|note3=|repealed=n|archived=n|}}

| {{|Brayton (Yorkshire, West Riding) inclosure.|private|99|20-11-1798|note3=|repealed=n|archived=n|}}

| {{|Tuxford (Nottinghamshire) inclosure.|private|100|20-11-1798|note3=|repealed=n|archived=n|}}

| {{|Teddington (Middlesex) inclosure.|private|101|20-11-1798|note3=|repealed=n|archived=n|}}

| {{|Sir Hyde Parker's divorce from Ann Boteler, and other provisions.|private|102|20-11-1798|note3=|repealed=n|archived=n|}}

| {{|Charles Campbell's divorce from Harriet Fraser, and other provisions.|private|103|20-11-1798|note3=|repealed=n|archived=n|}}

| {{|John Buller's divorce from Eliza Wiggins, and other provisions.|private|104|20-11-1798|note3=|repealed=n|archived=n|}}

| {{|Naturalization of John Reinaud.|private|105|20-11-1798|note3=|repealed=n|archived=n|}}

| {{|Naturalization of Philipp Behrends.|private|106|20-11-1798|note3=|repealed=n|archived=n|}}

| {{|Naturalization of Count Byland.|private|107|20-11-1798|note3=|repealed=n|archived=n|}}

| {{|Sir David Lindsay's estate: conveyance by trustees of an estate at Horleywood, Rickmansworth (Hertfordshire) and purchase of another estate, to be settled in lieu, with a power to let.|private|108|20-11-1798|note3=|repealed=n|archived=n|}}

| {{|Kempsford and Dryffield (Gloucestershire) inclosure.|private|109|20-11-1798|note3=|repealed=n|archived=n|}}

| {{|King's Bromley (Staffordshire) inclosure.|private|110|20-11-1798|note3=|repealed=n|archived=n|}}

| {{|Cumberworth (Yorkshire, West Riding) inclosure.|private|111|20-11-1798|note3=|repealed=n|archived=n|}}

| {{|North Crossland in Almondbury (Yorkshire, West Riding) inclosure.|private|112|20-11-1798|note3=|repealed=n|archived=n|}}

| {{|Kirkheaton (Yorkshire, West Riding) inclosure.|private|113|20-11-1798|note3=|repealed=n|archived=n|}}

| {{|Dalton (Yorkshire, West Riding) inclosure.|private|114|20-11-1798|note3=|repealed=n|archived=n|}}

| {{|Worlington (Suffolk) inclosure.|private|115|20-11-1798|note3=|repealed=n|archived=n|}}

| {{|Singleborough (Buckinghamshire) inclosure.|private|116|20-11-1798|note3=|repealed=n|archived=n|}}

| {{|Grantchester and Coton (Cambridgeshire) inclosure.|private|117|20-11-1798|note3=|repealed=n|archived=n|}}

| {{|Wyrardisbury (Buckinghamshire) inclosure.|private|118|20-11-1798|note3=|repealed=n|archived=n|}}

| {{|Naturalization of George Erck.|private|119|20-11-1798|note3=|repealed=n|archived=n|}}

| {{|Pampisford (Cambridgeshire) inclosure.|private|120|20-11-1798|note3=|repealed=n|archived=n|}}
}}

Local acts

| {{|Margate Pier Act 1799|local|2|20-11-1798|note3=|repealed=y|archived=n| |note4= }}

| {{|Whiteburn and Kelso Road Act 1799|local|3|20-11-1798|note3=|repealed=y|archived=n| |note4= }}

| {{|St. Bride, Fleet Street, Poor Relief Act 1799|local|4|20-11-1798|note3=|repealed=y|archived=n| |note4= }}

| {{|Oxford Canal Act 1799|local|5|21-03-1799|repealed=y|archived=n|An Act for explaining, amending, and rendering more effectual, several Acts, passed in the Ninth, Fifteenth, Twenty-sixth, and Thirty-fourth Years of the Reign of His present Majesty, for making and maintaining a Navigable Canal from the Coventry Canal Navigation to the City of Oxford.|note4= }}

| {{|Brixham Harbour and Market Act 1799|local|6|20-11-1798|note3=|repealed=y|archived=n| |note4= }}

| {{|Upton and Fishley Inclosures Act 1799|local|7|20-11-1798|note3=|repealed=n|archived=n|}}

| {{|Severn River Towing-path Act 1799|local|8|20-11-1798|note3=|repealed=n|archived=n|}}

| {{|Knaresborough and Green Hammerton Road Act 1799|local|9|20-11-1798|note3=|repealed=y|archived=n| |note4= }}

| {{|Ferrybridge, Wetherby and Boroughbridge Road Act 1799|local|10|20-11-1798|note3=|repealed=y|archived=n| |note4= }}

}}

39 & 40 Geo. 3

Public general acts

| {{|Duties upon Malt, etc. Act 1799|public|2|24-09-1799|note3=|repealed=y|archived=n|}}

| {{|Duties on Pensions, etc. Act 1799|public|3|24-09-1799|note3=|repealed=y|archived=n|}}

| {{|Loans or Exchequer Bills Act 1799|public|4|24-09-1799|note3=|repealed=y|archived=n|}}

| {{|Loans for Relief of Certain Merchants Act 1799|public|5|24-09-1799|note3=|repealed=y|archived=n|}}

| {{|Exchequer Bills Act 1799|public|6|24-09-1799|note3=|repealed=y|archived=n|}}

| {{|Distillation from Wheat, etc. Act 1799|public|7|24-09-1799|note3=|repealed=y|archived=n|}}

| {{|Duties on Spirits Act 1799|public|8|24-09-1799|note3=|repealed=y|archived=n|}}

| {{|Continuance of Acts Act 1799|public|9|24-09-1799|note3=|repealed=y|archived=n|}}

| {{|Land Tax Redemption Act 1799|public|10|24-09-1799|note3=|repealed=y|archived=n|}}

| {{|Appropriation of Certain Duties Act 1799|public|11|24-09-1799|note3=|repealed=y|archived=n|}}

| {{|Duties and Drawbacks Act 1799|public|12|24-09-1799|note3=|repealed=y|archived=n|}}

| {{|Loans to Grenada and Saint Vincent Traders Act 1799|public|13|24-09-1799|note3=|repealed=y|archived=n|}}

| {{|Meeting of Parliament Act 1799|note1=|public|14|12-10-1799|repealed=n|archived=n|An Act for empowering his Majesty to shorten the Time for the Meeting of Parliament in cases of Adjournment.}}
}}

1800

39 & 40 Geo. 3

Public general acts

| {{|Army and Navy Act 1800|public|16|24-09-1799|note3=|repealed=y|archived=n|}}

| {{|Continuance of Acts Act 1800|public|17|24-09-1799|note3=|repealed=y|archived=n|}}

| {{|Sale of Bread Act 1800|public|18|24-09-1799|note3=|repealed=y|archived=n|}}

| {{|Indemnity Act 1800|public|19|24-09-1799|note3=|repealed=y|archived=n|}}

| {{|Habeas Corpus Suspension Act 1800|public|20|24-09-1799|note3=|repealed=y|archived=n|}}

| {{|Distillation From Wheat, etc. Act 1800|public|21|24-09-1799|note3=|repealed=y|archived=n|}}

| {{|National Debt Act 1800|public|22|24-09-1799|note3=|repealed=y|archived=n|}}

| {{|Excise Act 1800|public|23|24-09-1799|note3=|repealed=y|archived=n|}}

| {{|Marine Mutiny Act 1800|public|24|24-09-1799|note3=|repealed=y|archived=n|}}

| {{|Use of Wheat in Making Starch Act 1800|public|25|24-09-1799|note3=|repealed=y|archived=n|}}

| {{|National Debt Act 1800|public|26|24-09-1799|note3=|repealed=y|archived=n|}}

| {{|Mutiny Act 1800|public|27|24-09-1799|note3=|repealed=y|archived=n|}}

| {{|Bank of England Act 1800|note1=|public|28|24-09-1799|note3=|repealed=y|archived=n|}}

| {{|Bounties on Importation Act 1800|public|29|24-09-1799|note3=|repealed=y|archived=n|}}

| {{|Land Tax Redemption Act 1800|public|30|24-09-1799|note3=|repealed=y|archived=n|}}

| {{|Duty on Pensions, etc. Act 1800|public|31|24-09-1799|note3=|repealed=y|archived=n|}}

| {{|Duties on Hair Powder, etc. Act 1800|public|32|24-09-1799|note3=|repealed=y|archived=n|}}

| {{|Exchequer Bills Act 1800 c 33|public|33|24-09-1799|note3=|repealed=y|archived=n|}}

| {{|Neutral Ships Act 1800|public|34|24-09-1799|note3=|repealed=y|archived=n|}}

| {{|Bounty on Importation Act 1800|public|35|24-09-1799|note3=|repealed=y|archived=n|}}

| {{|Transfer of Stock Act 1800|note1=|public|36|24-09-1799|note3=|repealed=y|archived=n|}}

| {{|Militia Pay Act 1800|public|37|24-09-1799|note3=|repealed=y|archived=n|}}

| {{|Saltpetre Act 1800|public|38|24-09-1799|note3=|repealed=y|archived=n|}}

| {{|Quartering of Soldiers Act 1800|public|39|24-09-1799|note3=|repealed=y|archived=n|}}

| {{|Poor Act 1800|public|40|24-09-1799|note3=|repealed=y|archived=n|}}

| {{|Ecclesiastical Leases Act 1800|note1=|public|41|24-09-1799|note3=|repealed=y|archived=n|}}

| {{|Bill of Exchange Act 1800|public|42|24-09-1799|note3=|repealed=y|archived=n|}}

| {{|Duke of Richmond's Annuity Act 1800|public|43|24-09-1799|note3=|repealed=y|archived=n|}}

| {{|Militia Allowances Act 1800|public|44|24-09-1799|note3=|repealed=y|archived=n|}}

| {{|Duties on Glass, etc. Act 1800|public|45|24-09-1799|note3=|repealed=y|archived=n|}}

| {{|Small Debts (Scotland) Act 1800|public|46|24-09-1799|note3=|repealed=y|archived=n|}}

| {{|Hackney Coaches, etc., London Act 1800|public|47|24-09-1799|note3=|repealed=y|archived=n|}}

| {{|Duties on Sugar, etc. Act 1800|public|48|24-09-1799|note3=|repealed=y|archived=n|}}

| {{|Duties on Income Act 1800|public|49|24-09-1799|note3=|repealed=y|archived=n|}}

| {{|Night Poaching Act 1800|public|50|24-09-1799|note3=|repealed=y|archived=n|}}

| {{|Customs Act 1800|public|51|24-09-1799|note3=|repealed=y|archived=n|}}

| {{|Lottery Act 1800|public|52|24-09-1799|note3=|repealed=y|archived=n|}}

| {{|Bounty on Rye Act 1800|public|53|24-09-1799|note3=|repealed=y|archived=n|}}

| {{|Public Accountants Act 1800|note1=|public|54|24-09-1799|note3=|repealed=y|archived=n|}}

| {{|Salaries of Scotch Judges Act 1800|public|55|24-09-1799|note3=|repealed=y|archived=n|}}

| {{|Entailed Estates Act 1800|public|56|24-09-1799|note3=|repealed=y|archived=n|}}

| {{|Harbour of Leith Act 1800|public|57|24-09-1799|note3=|repealed=y|archived=n|}}

| {{|Importation and Exportation Act 1800|public|58|24-09-1799|note3=|repealed=y|archived=n|}}

| {{|Customs Act 1800|public|59|24-09-1799|note3=|repealed=y|archived=n|}}

| {{|Customs Act 1800|public|60|24-09-1799|note3=|repealed=y|archived=n|}}

| {{|Duties on Wash Made from Sugar Act 1800|public|61|24-09-1799|note3=|repealed=y|archived=n|}}

| {{|Use of Sugar in Brewing Act 1800|public|62|24-09-1799|note3=|repealed=y|archived=n|}}

| {{|Duties on Kid Skins Act 1800|public|63|24-09-1799|note3=|repealed=y|archived=n|}}

| {{|Neutral Ships Act 1800|public|64|24-09-1799|note3=|repealed=y|archived=n|}}

| {{|Neutral Ships Act 1800|public|65|24-09-1799|note3=|repealed=y|archived=n|}}

| {{|Use of Horse Hides, etc. Act 1800|public|66|24-09-1799|note3=|repealed=y|archived=n|}}

| {{|Union with Ireland Act 1800|public|67|24-09-1799|note3=|repealed=n|archived=n|}}

| {{|Land Tax Act 1800|public|68|24-09-1799|note3=|repealed=y|archived=n|}}

| {{|Repeal of Certain Duties Act 1800|public|69|24-09-1799|note3=|repealed=y|archived=n|}}

| {{|Paper Duty Act 1800|public|70|24-09-1799|note3=|repealed=y|archived=n|}}

| {{|Sale of Bread Act 1800|public|71|24-09-1799|note3=|repealed=y|archived=n|}}

| {{|Administration of Estates (Probate) Act 1800|public|72|24-09-1799|note3=|repealed=y|archived=n|}}

| {{|Duties on Distillation Act 1800|public|73|24-09-1799|note3=|repealed=y|archived=n|}}

| {{|Price and Assise of Bread Act 1800|public|74|24-09-1799|note3=|repealed=y|archived=n|}}

| {{|Militia Allowances Act 1800|public|75|24-09-1799|note3=|repealed=y|archived=n|}}

| {{|Indemnity, West Indies Act 1800|public|76|24-09-1799|note3=|repealed=y|archived=n|}}

| {{|Collieries and Mines Act 1800|note1=|public|77|24-09-1799|note3=|repealed=y|archived=n|}}

| {{|Crown Lands – Forfeited Estates Act 1800|public|78|24-09-1799|note3=|repealed=y|archived=n|}}

| {{|Government of India Act 1800|note1=|public|79|24-09-1799|note3=|repealed=y|archived=n|}}

| {{|Quarantine Act 1800|public|80|24-09-1799|note3=|repealed=y|archived=n|}}

| {{|Hop Trade Act 1800|note1=|public|81|24-09-1799|note3=|repealed=y|archived=n|}}

| {{|Duties on Foreign Hops Act 1800|public|82|24-09-1799|note3=|repealed=y|archived=n|}}

| {{|Importation Act 1800|public|83|24-09-1799|note3=|repealed=y|archived=n|}}

| {{|Stamps Act 1800|public|84|24-09-1799|note3=|repealed=y|archived=n|}}

| {{|British Fisheries Act 1800|public|85|24-09-1799|note3=|repealed=y|archived=n|}}

| {{|New Forest Act 1800|public|86|24-09-1799|note3=|repealed=y|archived=n|}}

| {{|Depredations on the Thames Act 1800|public|87|24-09-1799|note3=|repealed=y|archived=n|}}

| {{|Crown Private Estate Act 1800 |note1=|public|88|28-07-1800|repealed=n|archived=n|An Act concerning the disposition of certain real and personal property of His Majesty, his heirs and successors; and also of the real and personal property of Her Majesty, and of the Queen Consort for the time being.}}

| {{|Embezzlement of Public Stores Act 1800|public|89|24-09-1799|note3=|repealed=y|archived=n|}}

| {{|Disputes Between Masters and Workmen Act 1800|public|90|24-09-1799|note3=|repealed=y|archived=n|}}

| {{|Exportation Act 1800|public|91|24-09-1799|note3=|repealed=y|archived=n|}}

| {{|House of Commons Act 1800|public|92|24-09-1799|note3=|repealed=y|archived=n|}}

| {{|Treason Act 1800|public|93|24-09-1799|note3=|repealed=y|archived=n|}}

| {{|Criminal Lunatics Act 1800|public|94|24-09-1799|note3=|repealed=y|archived=n|}}

| {{|Indemnity to Printers Act 1800|public|95|24-09-1799|note3=|repealed=y|archived=n|}}

| {{|Duties on Income Act 1800|public|96|24-09-1799|note3=|repealed=y|archived=n|}}

| {{|London Flour Company Act 1800|public|97|24-09-1799|note3=|repealed=y|archived=n|}}

| {{|Accumulations Act 1800|note1=|public|98|24-09-1799|note3=|repealed=y|archived=n|}}

| {{|Pawnbrokers Act 1800|public|99|24-09-1799|note3=|repealed=y|archived=n|}}

| {{|Army and Navy Act 1800|public|100|24-09-1799|note3=|repealed=y|archived=n|}}

| {{|Loans to Alexander Houston and Company, etc. Act 1800|public|101|24-09-1799|note3=|repealed=y|archived=n|}}

| {{|Loans or Exchequer Bills Act 1800|public|102|24-09-1799|note3=|repealed=y|archived=n|}}

| {{|Loans or Exchequer Bills Act 1800|public|103|24-09-1799|note3=|repealed=y|archived=n|}}

| {{|Loans or Exchequer Bills Act 1800|public|104|24-09-1799|note3=|repealed=y|archived=n|}}

| {{|Common Pleas of Lancaster Act 1800|public|105|24-09-1799|note3=|repealed=y|archived=n|}}

| {{|Unlawful Combinations of Workmen Act 1800|public|106|24-09-1799|note3=|repealed=y|archived=n|}}

| {{|Importation Act 1800|public|107|24-09-1799|note3=|repealed=y|archived=n|}}

| {{|Indemnity to Governor of Surinam Act 1800|public|108|24-09-1799|note3=|repealed=y|archived=n|}}

| {{|Exchequer Bills Act 1800|note1=|public|109|24-09-1799|note3=|repealed=y|archived=n|}}
}}

Private acts

| {{|Islip (Northamptonshire) inclosure.|private|2|24-09-1799|note3=|repealed=n|archived=n|}}

| {{|Salhouse (Norfolk) inclosure.|private|3|24-09-1799|note3=|repealed=n|archived=n|}}

| {{|Langley (Norfolk) inclosure.|private|4|24-09-1799|note3=|repealed=n|archived=n|}}

| {{|Cawston (Norfolk) inclosure.|private|5|24-09-1799|note3=|repealed=n|archived=n|}}

| {{|Locking (Somerset) inclosure.|private|6|24-09-1799|note3=|repealed=n|archived=n|}}

| {{|Bythorn (Huntingdonshire) inclosure.|private|7|24-09-1799|note3=|repealed=n|archived=n|}}

| {{|Thorpe (Norfolk) inclosure.|private|8|24-09-1799|note3=|repealed=n|archived=n|}}

| {{|Snettisham (Norfolk) inclosure.|private|9|24-09-1799|note3=|repealed=n|archived=n|}}

| {{|Wendlebury (Oxfordshire) inclosure.|private|10|24-09-1799|note3=|repealed=n|archived=n|}}

| {{|East Horseley (Surrey) inclosure.|private|11|24-09-1799|note3=|repealed=n|archived=n|}}

| {{|Bloxham (Oxfordshire) inclosure.|private|12|24-09-1799|note3=|repealed=n|archived=n|}}

| {{|Martin-with-Grafton (Yorkshire) inclosure.|private|13|24-09-1799|note3=|repealed=n|archived=n|}}

| {{|Burliscombe (Devon) inclosure.|private|14|24-09-1799|note3=|repealed=n|archived=n|}}

| {{|Skelmanthorpe (Yorkshire, West Riding) inclosure.|private|15|24-09-1799|note3=|repealed=n|archived=n|}}

| {{|Normanton-upon-Trent (Nottinghamshire) inclosure.|private|16|24-09-1799|note3=|repealed=n|archived=n|}}

| {{|Heneage Legge's and William Sheldon's estates: vesting property in Bermondsey (Surrey).|private|17|24-09-1799|note3=|repealed=n|archived=n|}}

| {{|Leverton (Lincolnshire) Rectory: uniting North mediety with South mediety.|note1=|private|18|24-09-1799|note3=|repealed=n|archived=n|}}

| {{|Milton (Cambridgeshire) inclosure.|private|19|24-09-1799|note3=|repealed=n|archived=n|}}

| {{|Ashby Woulds (Leicestershire) inclosure.|private|20|24-09-1799|note3=|repealed=n|archived=n|}}

| {{|Stoke-upon-Tern and Hinstock (Salop.) inclosure.|private|21|24-09-1799|note3=|repealed=n|archived=n|}}

| {{|Manor of Denby or Denby-with-Clayton West (Yorkshire, West Riding) inclosure.|private|22|24-09-1799|note3=|repealed=n|archived=n|}}

| {{|Over and Nether Dean (Bedfordshire) inclosure.|private|23|24-09-1799|note3=|repealed=n|archived=n|}}

| {{|Welford (Gloucestershire) inclosure.|private|24|24-09-1799|note3=|repealed=n|archived=n|}}

| {{|Tanfield Moor (Durham) inclosure.|private|25|24-09-1799|note3=|repealed=n|archived=n|}}

| {{|Farndish (Bedfordshire, Northamptonshire) inclosure.|private|26|24-09-1799|note3=|repealed=n|archived=n|}}

| {{|Rygall with Belmesthorpe (Rutland) inclosure.|private|27|24-09-1799|note3=|repealed=n|archived=n|}}

| {{|Ovington (Norfolk) inclosure.|private|28|24-09-1799|note3=|repealed=n|archived=n|}}

| {{|Barnack with Pilsgate (Northamptonshire) inclosure.|private|29|24-09-1799|note3=|repealed=n|archived=n|}}

| {{|Tholthorpe with Flawith (Yorkshire, North Riding) inclosure.|private|30|24-09-1799|note3=|repealed=n|archived=n|}}

| {{|Edward Columbine's divorce from Anna Starr, and other provisions.|private|31|24-09-1799|note3=|repealed=n|archived=n|}}

| {{|Shalbourn (Wiltshire, Berkshire) inclosure.|private|32|24-09-1799|note3=|repealed=n|archived=n|}}

| {{|West and East Poringland, Framingham Earl, Framingham Pigot, Bixley, Armeringhall, Stoke Holy Cross and Caister St. Edmund (Norfolk) inclosure and provision of compensation for tithes in East Poringland, Framingham Earl and Bixley.|private|33|24-09-1799|note3=|repealed=n|archived=n|}}

| {{|Wrawby-cum-Brigg (Lincolnshire) inclosure.|private|34|24-09-1799|note3=|repealed=n|archived=n|}}

| {{|Brooke (Norfolk) inclosure.|private|35|24-09-1799|note3=|repealed=n|archived=n|}}

| {{|Newton Bromshold and Higham Ferrers (Northamptonshire) inclosure.|private|36|24-09-1799|note3=|repealed=n|archived=n|}}

| {{|Barholm (Lincolnshire) inclosure.|private|37|24-09-1799|note3=|repealed=n|archived=n|}}

| {{|Womersley (Yorkshire, West Riding) inclosure.|private|38|24-09-1799|note3=|repealed=n|archived=n|}}

| {{|Parishes of St. John Hertford and All Saints Hertford (Hertfordshire) inclosures.|private|39|24-09-1799|note3=|repealed=n|archived=n|}}

| {{|Sir William Wolseley's estate: vesting the manor of Moreton (Staffordshire) and property therein in trustees for sale, and other provisions.|private|40|24-09-1799|note3=|repealed=n|archived=n|}}

| {{|Richard Wood's estate: vesting in trustees for sale, other estates to be purchased and settled in lieu.|private|41|24-09-1799|note3=|repealed=n|archived=n|}}

| {{|Little Plumstead (Norfolk) inclosure.|private|42|24-09-1799|note3=|repealed=n|archived=n|}}

| {{|Holmpton (Yorkshire, East Riding) inclosure.|private|43|24-09-1799|note3=|repealed=n|archived=n|}}

| {{|Newark-upon-Trent (Nottinghamshire) inclosure.|private|44|24-09-1799|note3=|repealed=n|archived=n|}}

| {{|Kellington (Yorkshire, West Riding) inclosure.|private|45|24-09-1799|note3=|repealed=n|archived=n|}}

| {{|Carlton and Camblesforth (Yorkshire, West Riding) inclosure.|private|46|24-09-1799|note3=|repealed=n|archived=n|}}

| {{|Sprowston (Norfolk) inclosure.|private|47|24-09-1799|note3=|repealed=n|archived=n|}}

| {{|Noman's or Norman's Moor (Yorkshire, North Riding) inclosure.|private|48|24-09-1799|note3=|repealed=n|archived=n|}}

| {{|Thurstonland (Yorkshire, West Riding) inclosure.|private|49|24-09-1799|note3=|repealed=n|archived=n|}}

| {{|Winterborne Stickland (Dorset) inclosure.|private|50|24-09-1799|note3=|repealed=n|archived=n|}}

| {{|Hanworth, Feltham, and Sunbury (Middlesex) inclosure.|private|51|24-09-1799|note3=|repealed=n|archived=n|}}

| {{|Kearby or Kirkby-cum-Netherby (Yorkshire, West Riding) inclosure.|private|52|24-09-1799|note3=|repealed=n|archived=n|}}

| {{|Hale and Halewood (Lancashire) inclosure.|private|53|24-09-1799|note3=|repealed=n|archived=n|}}

| {{|Braceborough (Lincolnshire) inclosure.|private|54|24-09-1799|note3=|repealed=n|archived=n|}}

| {{|Iver (Buckinghamshire) inclosure.|private|55|24-09-1799|note3=|repealed=n|archived=n|}}

| {{|Justinian Kerry: change of name and arms to Ekin.|private|56|24-09-1799|note3=|repealed=n|archived=n|}}

| {{|The new bridge at Bath: enabling the trustees to make repairs and to charge General Pultney's estates, or apply sums payable from the Kennet and Avon Canal, for that purpose.|private|57|24-09-1799|note3=|repealed=n|archived=n|}}

| {{|Ann Dickson's estate: empowering the Court of Session to sell parts of the Blairhall estate (Fife and Perth), for payment of debts, and for making provisions for the younger children.|private|58|24-09-1799|note3=|repealed=n|archived=n|}}

| {{|Exton and Cottesmore-with-Barrow (Rutland) inclosure.|private|59|24-09-1799|note3=|repealed=n|archived=n|}}

| {{|Cassington and Worton (Oxfordshire) inclosure.|private|60|24-09-1799|note3=|repealed=n|archived=n|}}

| {{|South Hykeham (Lincolnshire) inclosure.|private|61|24-09-1799|note3=|repealed=n|archived=n|}}

| {{|Guilden Morden (Cambridgeshire) inclosure.|private|62|24-09-1799|note3=|repealed=n|archived=n|}}

| {{|Eynsham (Oxfordshire) inclosure.|private|63|24-09-1799|note3=|repealed=n|archived=n|}}

| {{|Holywell-with-Needingworth (Huntingdonshire) inclosure.|private|64|24-09-1799|note3=|repealed=n|archived=n|}}

| {{|Horsford, Horsham St. Faith's and Newton St. Faith's (Norfolk) inclosure.|private|65|24-09-1799|note3=|repealed=n|archived=n|}}

| {{|Elsworth (Cambridgeshire) inclosure.|private|66|24-09-1799|note3=|repealed=n|archived=n|}}

| {{|Ingburchworth (Yorkshire, West Riding) inclosure.|private|67|24-09-1799|note3=|repealed=n|archived=n|}}

| {{|Seifton or Long Forest (Shropshire) inclosure.|private|68|24-09-1799|note3=|repealed=n|archived=n|}}

| {{|Wysall (Nottinghamshire) inclosure.|private|69|24-09-1799|note3=|repealed=n|archived=n|}}

| {{|St. Mary's, Stafford (Staffordshire) inclosure.|private|70|24-09-1799|note3=|repealed=n|archived=n|}}

| {{|Ordsall (Nottinghamshire) inclosure.|private|71|24-09-1799|note3=|repealed=n|archived=n|}}

| {{|Naturalization of Alexander Marcet.|private|72|24-09-1799|note3=|repealed=n|archived=n|}}

| {{|George Inn, Northampton.|private|73|24-09-1799|note3=|repealed=y|archived=n| |note4= }}

| {{|William Barbor's marriage settlement: granting trustees powers of sale, exchange and partition of estates in Somerset, and purchase of estates in Devon out of any proceeds, and granting a power to appoint new trustees.|private|74|24-09-1799|note3=|repealed=n|archived=n|}}

| {{|Rocester and Denston (Staffordshire) inclosure.|private|75|24-09-1799|note3=|repealed=n|archived=n|}}

| {{|Huntspill and Stert Common (Somerset) inclosure.|private|76|24-09-1799|note3=|repealed=n|archived=n|}}

| {{|Connington (Cambridgeshire) inclosure.|private|77|24-09-1799|note3=|repealed=n|archived=n|}}

| {{|Whitchurch (Oxfordshire) inclosure.|private|78|24-09-1799|note3=|repealed=n|archived=n|}}

| {{|Edmonton (Middlesex) inclosure.|private|79|24-09-1799|note3=|repealed=n|archived=n|}}

| {{|Chirton or Cherrington (Wiltshire) inclosure.|private|80|24-09-1799|note3=|repealed=n|archived=n|}}

| {{|Hunmanby and Fordon (Yorkshire, East Riding) inclosure and provision for compensation in lieu of tithes.|private|81|24-09-1799|note3=|repealed=n|archived=n|}}

| {{|Naturalization of Frederick Wistinghausen.|private|82|24-09-1799|note3=|repealed=n|archived=n|}}

| {{|Naturalization of Charles Nicolay.|private|83|24-09-1799|note3=|repealed=n|archived=n|}}

| {{|Sparsholt and Westcote (Berkshire) inclosure.|private|84|24-09-1799|note3=|repealed=n|archived=n|}}

| {{|Dedham Hall, Overall and Netherhall (Essex) inclosure.|private|85|24-09-1799|note3=|repealed=n|archived=n|}}

| {{|Naturalization of Francis Micheli.|private|86|24-09-1799|note3=|repealed=n|archived=n|}}

| {{|Naturalization of John Tulliken.|private|87|24-09-1799|note3=|repealed=n|archived=n|}}

| {{|Naturalization of John de Boubée de Brouquens.|private|88|24-09-1799|note3=|repealed=n|archived=n|}}

| {{|Naturalization of Johan Sultzbergen.|private|89|24-09-1799|note3=|repealed=n|archived=n|}}

| {{|Naturalization of Jean Vallette.|private|90|24-09-1799|note3=|repealed=n|archived=n|}}
}}

Local acts

| {{|Leicester and Ashby-de-la-Zouch Road Act 1800|local|2|24-09-1799|note3=|repealed=y|archived=n| |note4= }}

| {{|Leicester and Narborough and Hinckley Roads Act 1800|local|3|24-09-1799|note3=|repealed=y|archived=n| |note4= }}

| {{|Great Yarmouth Harbour Act 1800|local|4|24-09-1799|note3=|repealed=y|archived=n| |note4= }}

| {{|Cantley and Hassingham Inclosure and Drainage Act 1800|local|5|24-09-1799|note3=|repealed=n|archived=n|}}

| {{|Brent Bridge and Plymouth Road Act 1800|local|6|24-09-1799|note3=|repealed=y|archived=n| |note4= }}

| {{|Ilchester Roads Act 1800|local|7|24-09-1799|note3=|repealed=y|archived=n| |note4= }}

| {{|Sevenoaks and Tunbridge Wells Road Tolls Act 1800|local|8|24-09-1799|note3=|repealed=y|archived=n| |note4= }}

| {{|Milford and Dunckton Hill and Stopham Bridge Roads Act 1800|local|9|24-09-1799|note3=|repealed=y|archived=n| |note4= }}

| {{|Kingston-upon-Hull Dock Act 1800|local|10|24-09-1799|note3=|repealed=y|archived=n| |note4= }}

| {{|Aberdeen Streets Act 1800|local|11|24-09-1799|note3=|repealed=y|archived=n|}}

| {{|Hexham and Alston Road Act 1800|local|12|24-09-1799|note3=|repealed=y|archived=n| |note4= }}

| {{|Halifax and Sowerby Bridge and Burnley and Littleborough Roads Act 1800|local|13|24-09-1799|note3=|repealed=y|archived=n| |note4= }}

| {{|Greenhead and Shildon Bar Road and Corbridge Branch Act 1800|local|14|24-09-1799|note3=|repealed=y|archived=n| |note4= }}

| {{|Magor and Chepstow Road Act 1800|local|15|24-09-1799|note3=|repealed=y|archived=n|}}

| {{|Witney and Woodstock Roads Act 1800|local|16|24-09-1799|note3=|repealed=y|archived=n|}}

| {{|Stonehaven and Cobleheugh Road Act 1800|local|17|24-09-1799|note3=|repealed=y|archived=n| |note4= }}

| {{|Wakefield and Austerlands Road Act 1800|local|18|24-09-1799|note3=|repealed=y|archived=n| |note4= }}

| {{|Haslingden and Todmorden Road and Branches Act 1800|local|19|24-09-1799|note3=|repealed=y|archived=n| |note4= }}

| {{|Alemouth and Hexham Road and Branches Act 1800|local|20|24-09-1799|note3=|repealed=y|archived=n| |note4= }}

| {{|Ludham Inclosure Act 1800|local|21|24-09-1799|note3=|repealed=n|archived=n|}}

| {{|Heronsyke, Kendal and Eamont Bridge Road Act 1800|local|22|24-09-1799|note3=|repealed=y|archived=n|}}

| {{|Thames and Medway Canal Act 1800|local|23|24-09-1799|note3=|repealed=n|archived=n|}}

| {{|Ashton Canal Act 1800|local|24|24-09-1799|note3=|repealed=n|archived=n|}}

| {{|Berwick-upon-Tweed Improvement Act 1800|local|25|24-09-1799|note3=|repealed=n|archived=n|}}

| {{|Bedford Level (Hundred Foot River and Ouse) Drainage Act 1800|local|26|24-09-1799|note3=|repealed=n|archived=n|}}

| {{|Leatherhead and Stoke (Surrey) Road Act 1800|local|27|24-09-1799|note3=|repealed=y|archived=n|}}

| {{|Lyme Regis Roads Act 1800|local|28|24-09-1799|note3=|repealed=y|archived=n| |note4= }}

| {{|Ripon and Pateley Bridge Road Act 1800|local|29|24-09-1799|note3=|repealed=y|archived=n|}}

| {{|Denbigh and Ruthland Road Act 1800|local|30|24-09-1799|note3=|repealed=y|archived=n|}}

| {{|Wrexham and Pentre Bridge Road Act 1800|local|31|24-09-1799|note3=|repealed=y|archived=n|}}

| {{|Aberdeen County Roads and Bridges Act 1800|local|32|24-09-1799|note3=|repealed=y|archived=n| |note4= }}

| {{|Croston, Mawdesley, Rufford, Bispham, Tarleton and Bretherton Drainage Act 1800|local|33|24-09-1799|note3=|repealed=n|archived=n|}}

| {{|Perth, Cupar and Glammis Road Act 1800|local|34|24-09-1799|note3=|repealed=y|archived=n|}}

| {{|St. John Hampstead Poor Relief Act 1800|local|35|24-09-1799|note3=|repealed=y|archived=n|}}

| {{|Rochdale Canal Act 1800|local|36|24-09-1799|note3=|repealed=n|archived=n|}}

| {{|Dearne and Dove Canal Act 1800|local|37|24-09-1799|note3=|repealed=n|archived=n|}}

| {{|Peak Forest Canal Act 1800|local|38|24-09-1799|note3=|repealed=n|archived=n|}}

| {{|Huddersfield Narrow Canal Act 1800|local|39|24-09-1799|note3=|repealed=n|archived=n|}}

| {{|Huntingdonshire and Cambridgeshire Drainage Act 1800|local|40|24-09-1799|note3=|repealed=n|archived=n|}}

| {{|Wich Tree Bridge Act 1800|local|41|24-09-1799|note3=|repealed=y|archived=n| |note4= }}

| {{|Temple Bar Improvement Act 1800|local|42|24-09-1799|note3=|repealed=n|archived=n|}}

| {{|Rodburgh and Birdlip Road (Glos.) Act 1800|local|43|24-09-1799|note3=|repealed=y|archived=n| |note4= }}

| {{|Norton and Halton Estate Roads (Chester) Act 1800|local|44|24-09-1799|note3=|repealed=n|archived=n|}}

| {{|Nottingham, Oakerthorpe and Wirksworth Roads Act 1800|local|45|24-09-1799|note3=|repealed=y|archived=n| |note4= }}

| {{|Chippenham and Westerleigh Road Act 1800|local|46|24-09-1799|note3=|repealed=y|archived=n|}}

| {{|Port of London Improvement Act 1800|local|47|24-09-1799|note3=|repealed=y|archived=n| |note4= }}

| {{|Aldbourne Workhouse and Overseers Act 1800|local|48|24-09-1799|note3=|repealed=n|archived=n|}}

| {{|St. Pancras Improvement Act 1800|local|49|24-09-1799|note3=|repealed=y|archived=n|}}

| {{|Russell Square Improvement Act 1800|local|50|24-09-1799|note3=|repealed=n|archived=n|}}

| {{|Chelmsford Parish Church Act 1800|local|51|24-09-1799|note3=|repealed=n|archived=n|}}

| {{|Argyllshire Roads and Bridges Act 1800|local|52|24-09-1799|note3=|repealed=y|archived=n| |note4= }}

| {{|New Sarum Gaol Act 1800|local|53|24-09-1799|note3=|repealed=y|archived=n| |note4= }}

| {{|Ouse Navigation and Lewes and Laughton Levels Drainage Act 1800|local|54|24-09-1799|note3=|repealed=y|archived=n| |note4= }}

| {{|Melton Mowbray Navigation (Completion) Act 1800|local|55|24-09-1799|note3=|repealed=n|archived=n|}}

| {{|Oakham Canal Act 1800|local|56|24-09-1799|note3=|repealed=n|archived=n|}}

| {{|Lancaster Canal Act 1800|local|57|24-09-1799|note3=|repealed=n|archived=n|}}

| {{|Staffordshire Inclosure and Drainage Act 1800|local|58|24-09-1799|note3=|repealed=n|archived=n|}}

| {{|Fullbridge, Maldon, Bridge over River Chelmer Act 1800|local|59|24-09-1799|note3=|repealed=n|archived=n|}}

| {{|Female Orphan Asylum Act 1800|local|60|24-09-1799|note3=|repealed=n|archived=n|}}

| {{|Dorset, Devon and Somerset Roads Act 1800|local|61|24-09-1799|note3=|repealed=y|archived=n| |note4= }}

| {{|Elsdon and Red Swyre Road Act 1800|local|62|24-09-1799|note3=|repealed=y|archived=n|}}

| {{|Borrowstouness and Hollhouseburn Road (Linlithgow) Act 1800|local|63|24-09-1799|note3=|repealed=y|archived=n|}}

| {{|Newport (Salop.) and Stonnall Road Act 1800|local|64|24-09-1799|note3=|repealed=y|archived=n|}}

| {{|Leominster Roads Act 1800|local|65|24-09-1799|note3=|repealed=y|archived=n|}}

| {{|Ruthin and Mold Roads Act 1800|local|66|24-09-1799|note3=|repealed=y|archived=n|}}

| {{|Hockliffe, Woburn and Newport Pagnell Roads Act 1800|local|67|24-09-1799|note3=|repealed=y|archived=n| |note4= }}

| {{|Radnor, Hereford and Salop. Roads Act 1800|local|68|24-09-1799|note3=|repealed=y|archived=n|}}

| {{|Roads from Warminster and from Frome Act 1800|local|69|24-09-1799|note3=|repealed=y|archived=n| |note4= }}

| {{|Lincoln Heath and Peterborough Road Act 1800|local|70|24-09-1799|note3=|repealed=y|archived=n| |note4= }}

| {{|Bewdley Roads Act 1800|local|71|24-09-1799|note3=|repealed=y|archived=n|}}

| {{|Spalding High Bridge and Maxey Outgang Roads Act 1800|local|72|24-09-1799|note3=|repealed=y|archived=n| |note4= }}

| {{|Ince and Ashton in Mackerfield Road Act 1800|local|73|24-09-1799|note3=|repealed=y|archived=n|}}

| {{|Great Bolton and Westhoughton Chapel Road Act 1800|local|74|24-09-1799|note3=|repealed=y|archived=n| |note4= }}

| {{|Tetbury and Horsley Roads Act 1800|local|75|24-09-1799|note3=|repealed=y|archived=n| |note4= }}

| {{|Gloucestershire and Wiltshire Roads Act 1800|local|76|24-09-1799|note3=|repealed=y|archived=n| |note4= }}

| {{|Duke of Newcastle's Estate Act 1800|local|77|24-09-1799|note3=|repealed=n|archived=n|}}

| {{|Hicks' Estate Act 1800|local|78|24-09-1799|note3=|repealed=n|archived=n|}}

| {{|Powney's Estate Act 1800|local|79|24-09-1799|note3=|repealed=n|archived=n|}}

| {{|Chichester Cathedral and Selsey and Peachey Estates Act 1800|local|80|24-09-1799|note3=|repealed=n|archived=n|}}

| {{|Earl of Guilford's Estate Act 1800|local|81|24-09-1799|note3=|repealed=n|archived=n|}}

| {{|Jervoise's Estate Act 1800|local|82|24-09-1799|note3=|repealed=n|archived=n|}}

| {{|Child's Estate Act 1800|local|83|24-09-1799|note3=|repealed=n|archived=n|}}

| {{|Dormer's Estate Act 1800|local|84|24-09-1799|note3=|repealed=n|archived=n|}}

| {{|Llanfwrog Inclosure Act 1800|local|85|24-09-1799|note3=|repealed=n|archived=n|}}

| {{|Walton-upon-Thames and Walton Leigh Inclosure Act 1800|local|86|24-09-1799|note3=|repealed=n|archived=n|}}

| {{|Byfleet and Weybridge Inclosures Act 1800|local|87|24-09-1799|note3=|repealed=n|archived=n|}}

| {{|Glasgow City Extension and Improvement Act 1800|note1=(also known as the Glasgow Police Act 1800)|local|88|30-06-1800|repealed=n|archived=n|An Act for extending the Royalty of the City of Glasgow over certain adjacent Lands; for paving, lighting, and cleansing the Streets; for regulating the Police, and appointing Officers and Watchmen; for dividing the City into Wards, and appointing Commissioners; and for raising Funds, and for giving certain Powers to the Magistrates and Council, and Town and Dean of Guild Courts, for the above and other Purposes.}}

| {{|Bank of England Act 1800|local|89|24-09-1799|note3=|repealed=y|archived=n| |note4= }}

| {{|Bedford Level (Cam, Ouse and Mildenhall Rivers) Drainage Act 1800|local|90|24-09-1799|note3=|repealed=n|archived=n|}}

| {{|Bedford Level (North Level, Fourth District) Drainage Act 1800|local|91|24-09-1799|note3=|repealed=n|archived=n|}}

| {{|Rea Drainage and Worthen Inclosure Act 1800|local|92|24-09-1799|note3=|repealed=n|archived=n|}}

| {{|Kidderminster Roads Act 1800|local|93|24-09-1799|note3=|repealed=y|archived=n| |note4= }}

| {{|Parkhouse (Lanarkshire) Roadss Act 1800|local|94|24-09-1799|note3=|repealed=y|archived=n| |note4= }}

| {{|Hundred House (Worcestershire) Roads Act 1800|local|95|24-09-1799|note3=|repealed=y|archived=n|}}

| {{|Road from Gloucester to the Bristol Road Act 1800|local|96|24-09-1799|note3=|repealed=y|archived=n|}}

| {{|Gloucester and Stroud Road Act 1800|local|97|24-09-1799|note3=|repealed=y|archived=n| |note4= }}

| {{|Blake's Estate Act 1800|local|98|24-09-1799|note3=|repealed=n|archived=n|}}

| {{|Hotham's Estate Act 1800|local|99|24-09-1799|note3=|repealed=n|archived=n|}}

| {{|Rastall's Estate Act 1800|local|100|24-09-1799|note3=|repealed=n|archived=n|}}

| {{|Wright's Estate Act 1800|local|101|24-09-1799|note3=|repealed=n|archived=n|}}

| {{|Pigot and Fisher Diamond Lottery Act 1800|local|102|24-09-1799|note3=|repealed=n|archived=n|}}

| {{|Duke of Richmond's Annuity Act 1800|local|103|24-09-1799|note3=|repealed=n|archived=n|}}

| {{|City of London Court of Requests Act 1800|local|104|24-09-1799|note3=|repealed=y|archived=n| |note4= }}

| {{|St. Mary's Chapel, Caernarvon Act 1800|local|105|24-09-1799|note3=|repealed=n|archived=n|}}

| {{|Hunter Street Church, Liverpool Act 1800|local|106|24-09-1799|note3=|repealed=n|archived=n|}}

| {{|Neath River and Harbour Act 1800|local|107|24-09-1799|note3=|repealed=n|archived=n|}}

| {{|Itchen Navigation Act 1800|local|108|24-09-1799|note3=|repealed=n|archived=n|}}

| {{|Horncastle Navigation Act 1800|local|109|24-09-1799|note3=|repealed=n|archived=n|}}

| {{|Essex and Middlesex Roads Act 1800|local|110|24-09-1799|note3=|repealed=y|archived=n| |note4= }}

| {{|Keighley and Kendal Road Act 1800|local|111|24-09-1799|note3=|repealed=y|archived=n| |note4= }}

| {{|Sutton (Surrey) and Povey Cross Road Act 1800|local|112|24-09-1799|note3=|repealed=y|archived=n| |note4= }}

| {{|Marquis of Downshire's Estate Act 1800|local|113|24-09-1799|note3=|repealed=n|archived=n|}}

| {{|Brigges' Estate Act 1800|local|114|24-09-1799|note3=|repealed=n|archived=n|}}

| {{|Pitt's Estate Act 1800|local|115|24-09-1799|note3=|repealed=n|archived=n|}}

| {{|Ysceifiog and Nannerch Inclosures Act 1800|local|116|24-09-1799|note3=|repealed=n|archived=n|}}

| {{|Scrase's Estate Act 1800|local|117|24-09-1799|note3=|repealed=n|archived=n|}}

| {{|Muston (Yorkshire), &c., Drainage (Rivers Derwent and Harford) Act 1800|local|118|24-09-1799|note3=|repealed=n|archived=n|}}

| {{|Cooksey's Estate Act 1800|local|119|24-09-1799|note3=|repealed=n|archived=n|}}

| {{|Whitford Inclosure Act 1800|local|120|24-09-1799|note3=|repealed=n|archived=n|}}

}}

41 Geo. 3

Public general acts

| {{|Exportation Act 1800|public|2|11-11-1800|note3=|repealed=y|archived=n|}}

| {{|Use of Corn in Distillation of Spirits, etc. Act 1800|public|3|11-11-1800|note3=|repealed=y|archived=n|}}

| {{|Duties on Hops Act 1800|public|4|11-11-1800|note3=|repealed=y|archived=n|}}

| {{|Continuance of Laws Act 1800|public|5|11-11-1800|note3=|repealed=y|archived=n|}}

| {{|Malting Act 1800|public|6|11-11-1800|note3=|repealed=y|archived=n|}}

| {{|Malt Duties Act 1800|public|7|11-11-1800|note3=|repealed=y|archived=n|}}

| {{|Duty on Pensions, etc. Act 1800|public|8|11-11-1800|note3=|repealed=y|archived=n|}}

| {{|Poor Act 1800|public|9|11-11-1800|note3=|repealed=y|archived=n|}}

| {{|Bounties on Importation Act 1800|public|10|11-11-1800|note3=|repealed=y|archived=n|}}

| {{|Importation Act 1800|public|11|11-11-1800|note3=|repealed=y|archived=n|}}

| {{|Poor Act 1800|public|12|11-11-1800|note3=|repealed=y|archived=n|}}

| {{|Public Buildings – Houses of Parliament Act 1800|public|13|11-11-1800|note3=|repealed=y|archived=n|}}

| {{|Appropriation Act 1800|public|14|11-11-1800|note3=|repealed=y|archived=n|}}

| {{|Census Act 1800|public|15|11-11-1800|note3=|repealed=y|archived=n|}}

| {{|Making of Bread, etc. Act 1800|public|16|11-11-1800|note3=|repealed=y|archived=n|}}

| {{|Sale of Bread Act 1800|public|17|11-11-1800|note3=|repealed=y|archived=n|}}

| {{|Importation Act 1800|public|18|11-11-1800|note3=|repealed=y|archived=n|}}

| {{|Amendment of c 10 of this Session Act 1800|public|19|11-11-1800|note3=|repealed=y|archived=n|}}

| {{|Continuance of Laws Act 1800|public|20|11-11-1800|note3=|repealed=y|archived=n|}}

| {{|Use of Salt Duty Free, etc. Act 1800|public|21|11-11-1800|note3=|repealed=y|archived=n|}}

| {{|Expenditure in the West Indies Act 1800|public|22|11-11-1800|note3=|repealed=y|archived=n|}}

| {{|Free Ports Act 1800|public|23|11-11-1800|note3=|repealed=y|archived=n|}}

| {{|Aliens Act 1800|public|24|11-11-1800|note3=|repealed=y|archived=n|}}

| {{|Importation Act 1800|public|25|11-11-1800|note3=|repealed=y|archived=n|}}

| {{|Turnpike Acts Continuance Act 1800|public|26|11-11-1800|note3=|repealed=y|archived=n|}}

| {{|Grenada and Saint Vincent Traders Act 1800|public|27|11-11-1800|note3=|repealed=y|archived=n|}}

| {{|Land Tax Redemption Act 1800|public|28|11-11-1800|note3=|repealed=y|archived=n|}}

| {{|Army and Navy Act 1800|public|29|11-11-1800|note3=|repealed=y|archived=n|}}

| {{|Quarantine, etc. Act 1800|public|30|11-11-1800|note3=|repealed=y|archived=n|}}

| {{|Indemnity Act 1800|public|31|11-11-1800|note3=|repealed=n|archived=n|}}

| {{|Habeas Corpus Suspension Act 1800|public|32|11-11-1800|note3=|repealed=y|archived=n|}}

}}

Private acts

| {{|Naturalization of Charles Lullin Act 1800|personal|2|11-11-1800|note3=|repealed=n|archived=n|}}

| {{|Offord Cluney (Huntingdonshire) Inclosure Act 1800|private|3|11-11-1800|note3=|repealed=n|archived=n|}}

| {{|Arlington (Gloucestershire) Inclosure Act 1800|private|4|11-11-1800|note3=|repealed=n|archived=n|}}

| {{|Naturalization of Christoph Weltjé Act 1800|personal|5|11-11-1800|note3=|repealed=n|archived=n|}}
}}

Local acts

| {{|Sonning and Virginia Water Road Act 1800|local|2|11-11-1800|note3=|repealed=y|archived=n| |note4= }}

| {{|Edinburgh Poor Relief Act 1800|local|3|11-11-1800|note3=|repealed=y|archived=n| |note4= }}

| {{|Earl of Bathurst's Estate Act 1800|local|4|11-11-1800|note3=|repealed=n|archived=n|}}
}}

See also
List of Acts of the Parliament of Great Britain

References

External links
The Statutes of the Realm
- Volume 40, Part 1 - 35 George III - 1794-5  - and Part 2 - 36 George III - 1795-6
- Volume 41, Part 1 - 37 George III - 1796-7 - and Part 2 - 38 George III - 1797-8
- Volume 42, Part 1 - 39 George III - 1798-9

1795
1790s in Great Britain
1800 in Great Britain